This is a partial list of unnumbered minor planets for principal provisional designations assigned during 1–31 August 2004. , a total of 533 bodies remain unnumbered for this period. Objects for this year are listed on the following pages: A–B · C · D–E · F · G–H · J–O · P–Q · Ri · Rii · Riii · S · Ti · Tii · Tiii · Tiv · U–V · W–X and Y. Also see previous and next year.

P 

|- id="2004 PB" bgcolor=#E9E9E9
| 0 || 2004 PB || MBA-M || 17.19 || 1.5 km || multiple || 2000–2021 || 30 Jul 2021 || 144 || align=left | — || 
|- id="2004 PJ" bgcolor=#FFC2E0
| 4 || 2004 PJ || AMO || 22.8 || data-sort-value="0.098" | 98 m || single || 71 days || 23 Aug 2004 || 110 || align=left | — || 
|- id="2004 PK" bgcolor=#FA8072
| 0 || 2004 PK || MCA || 17.14 || 1.8 km || multiple || 2004–2021 || 04 Oct 2021 || 163 || align=left | — || 
|- id="2004 PQ" bgcolor=#fefefe
| 0 || 2004 PQ || MBA-I || 17.0 || 1.2 km || multiple || 2004–2021 || 13 Jun 2021 || 146 || align=left | — || 
|- id="2004 PW" bgcolor=#E9E9E9
| 0 || 2004 PW || MBA-M || 17.1 || 2.1 km || multiple || 2004–2020 || 23 Jan 2020 || 109 || align=left | — || 
|- id="2004 PB1" bgcolor=#fefefe
| 0 ||  || MBA-I || 18.54 || data-sort-value="0.58" | 580 m || multiple || 2004–2021 || 11 May 2021 || 112 || align=left | — || 
|- id="2004 PK1" bgcolor=#fefefe
| 0 ||  || HUN || 17.75 || data-sort-value="0.84" | 840 m || multiple || 2001–2021 || 06 Apr 2021 || 246 || align=left | Alt.: 2011 BH18 || 
|- id="2004 PL1" bgcolor=#FA8072
| 0 ||  || MCA || 18.76 || data-sort-value="0.53" | 530 m || multiple || 2004–2021 || 08 May 2021 || 115 || align=left | — || 
|- id="2004 PC2" bgcolor=#FA8072
| 2 ||  || MCA || 18.8 || data-sort-value="0.52" | 520 m || multiple || 2001–2019 || 29 Jul 2019 || 66 || align=left | — || 
|- id="2004 PJ2" bgcolor=#FFC2E0
| 0 ||  || APO || 21.57 || data-sort-value="0.17" | 170 m || multiple || 1999–2021 || 02 Oct 2021 || 129 || align=left | Potentially hazardous object || 
|- id="2004 PK2" bgcolor=#FA8072
| – ||  || MCA || 19.3 || data-sort-value="0.41" | 410 m || single || 3 days || 11 Aug 2004 || 50 || align=left | — || 
|- id="2004 PM2" bgcolor=#FFC2E0
| 1 ||  || AMO || 19.3 || data-sort-value="0.49" | 490 m || multiple || 2004–2012 || 22 Jun 2012 || 109 || align=left | — || 
|- id="2004 PO2" bgcolor=#E9E9E9
| 0 ||  || MBA-M || 17.0 || 1.7 km || multiple || 1982–2021 || 09 Jun 2021 || 126 || align=left | — || 
|- id="2004 PK3" bgcolor=#FA8072
| 0 ||  || MCA || 18.45 || data-sort-value="0.61" | 610 m || multiple || 1997–2021 || 13 May 2021 || 109 || align=left | — || 
|- id="2004 PN5" bgcolor=#fefefe
| 0 ||  || MBA-I || 17.80 || data-sort-value="0.82" | 820 m || multiple || 2004–2021 || 14 Apr 2021 || 81 || align=left | — || 
|- id="2004 PO5" bgcolor=#E9E9E9
| – ||  || MBA-M || 17.4 || data-sort-value="0.98" | 980 m || single || 8 days || 14 Aug 2004 || 12 || align=left | — || 
|- id="2004 PT5" bgcolor=#fefefe
| 3 ||  || MBA-I || 18.3 || data-sort-value="0.65" | 650 m || multiple || 2004–2015 || 01 Dec 2015 || 21 || align=left | — || 
|- id="2004 PW6" bgcolor=#fefefe
| 1 ||  || MBA-I || 16.8 || 1.3 km || multiple || 2004–2021 || 18 Jan 2021 || 140 || align=left | — || 
|- id="2004 PE7" bgcolor=#E9E9E9
| 0 ||  || MBA-M || 17.39 || 1.9 km || multiple || 1995–2021 || 31 May 2021 || 107 || align=left | — || 
|- id="2004 PX8" bgcolor=#E9E9E9
| 0 ||  || MBA-M || 17.56 || data-sort-value="0.91" | 910 m || multiple || 2004–2022 || 06 Jan 2022 || 129 || align=left | — || 
|- id="2004 PS9" bgcolor=#E9E9E9
| 0 ||  || MBA-M || 16.4 || 2.2 km || multiple || 2002–2021 || 08 Jun 2021 || 200 || align=left | Alt.: 2005 XW75, 2014 YM18, 2018 VB68 || 
|- id="2004 PB10" bgcolor=#fefefe
| 0 ||  || MBA-I || 17.9 || data-sort-value="0.78" | 780 m || multiple || 2004–2018 || 12 Jul 2018 || 64 || align=left | Alt.: 2015 TT147 || 
|- id="2004 PZ10" bgcolor=#fefefe
| 0 ||  || MBA-I || 18.70 || data-sort-value="0.54" | 540 m || multiple || 2004–2021 || 08 Sep 2021 || 43 || align=left | Alt.: 2021 LL19 || 
|- id="2004 PL11" bgcolor=#d6d6d6
| – ||  || MBA-O || 16.5 || 2.8 km || single || 2 days || 09 Aug 2004 || 10 || align=left | — || 
|- id="2004 PO12" bgcolor=#fefefe
| 0 ||  || MBA-I || 17.7 || data-sort-value="0.86" | 860 m || multiple || 2004–2020 || 10 Dec 2020 || 91 || align=left | — || 
|- id="2004 PO13" bgcolor=#fefefe
| 0 ||  || MBA-I || 17.6 || data-sort-value="0.90" | 900 m || multiple || 2004–2021 || 07 Jun 2021 || 197 || align=left | Alt.: 2008 XB57, 2014 JZ8 || 
|- id="2004 PD14" bgcolor=#E9E9E9
| 1 ||  || MBA-M || 17.3 || 1.5 km || multiple || 2004–2018 || 15 Dec 2018 || 62 || align=left | — || 
|- id="2004 PK15" bgcolor=#d6d6d6
| 0 ||  || MBA-O || 16.2 || 3.2 km || multiple || 2004–2021 || 06 Jan 2021 || 193 || align=left | Alt.: 2005 WD174, 2015 VS114 || 
|- id="2004 PM15" bgcolor=#E9E9E9
| 1 ||  || MBA-M || 16.9 || 2.3 km || multiple || 2004–2019 || 09 Jan 2019 || 105 || align=left | Alt.: 2013 PB54 || 
|- id="2004 PL17" bgcolor=#FA8072
| 0 ||  || MCA || 18.41 || data-sort-value="0.62" | 620 m || multiple || 2004–2021 || 08 Nov 2021 || 136 || align=left | — || 
|- id="2004 PY17" bgcolor=#fefefe
| 1 ||  || MBA-I || 17.2 || 1.1 km || multiple || 2004–2021 || 17 Jan 2021 || 95 || align=left | — || 
|- id="2004 PZ19" bgcolor=#FFC2E0
| 6 ||  || APO || 24.5 || data-sort-value="0.045" | 45 m || single || 2 days || 10 Aug 2004 || 95 || align=left | — || 
|- id="2004 PE20" bgcolor=#FFC2E0
| 1 ||  || AMO || 20.1 || data-sort-value="0.34" | 340 m || multiple || 2004–2014 || 21 Nov 2014 || 232 || align=left | — || 
|- id="2004 PF20" bgcolor=#FFC2E0
| 6 ||  || AMO || 22.5 || data-sort-value="0.11" | 110 m || single || 30 days || 08 Sep 2004 || 67 || align=left | — || 
|- id="2004 PG20" bgcolor=#FFC2E0
| 6 ||  || AMO || 24.5 || data-sort-value="0.045" | 45 m || single || 32 days || 09 Sep 2004 || 34 || align=left | — || 
|- id="2004 PA24" bgcolor=#E9E9E9
| 0 ||  || MBA-M || 16.6 || 2.7 km || multiple || 2004–2021 || 18 Jan 2021 || 98 || align=left | Alt.: 2017 CR30 || 
|- id="2004 PE24" bgcolor=#fefefe
| 0 ||  || MBA-I || 18.96 || data-sort-value="0.48" | 480 m || multiple || 2004–2021 || 11 Apr 2021 || 34 || align=left | Alt.: 2015 TD65 || 
|- id="2004 PJ25" bgcolor=#E9E9E9
| 0 ||  || MBA-M || 17.70 || data-sort-value="0.86" | 860 m || multiple || 2000–2021 || 25 Nov 2021 || 134 || align=left | — || 
|- id="2004 PK26" bgcolor=#FA8072
| – ||  || MCA || 19.0 || data-sort-value="0.47" | 470 m || single || 43 days || 21 Sep 2004 || 44 || align=left | — || 
|- id="2004 PP26" bgcolor=#E9E9E9
| 0 ||  || MBA-M || 17.69 || data-sort-value="0.86" | 860 m || multiple || 2000–2021 || 09 Dec 2021 || 131 || align=left | Alt.: 2000 SD298 || 
|- id="2004 PX26" bgcolor=#fefefe
| 0 ||  || HUN || 18.08 || data-sort-value="0.72" | 720 m || multiple || 2004–2021 || 02 Dec 2021 || 161 || align=left | — || 
|- id="2004 PB27" bgcolor=#d6d6d6
| – ||  || MBA-O || 17.6 || 1.7 km || single || 25 days || 02 Sep 2004 || 110 || align=left | — || 
|- id="2004 PW27" bgcolor=#FA8072
| 1 ||  || MCA || 18.0 || 1.4 km || multiple || 2004–2019 || 02 Nov 2019 || 64 || align=left | — || 
|- id="2004 PY27" bgcolor=#FFC2E0
| 2 ||  || AMO || 20.7 || data-sort-value="0.26" | 260 m || multiple || 2004–2018 || 07 Jun 2018 || 33 || align=left | — || 
|- id="2004 PG29" bgcolor=#fefefe
| 1 ||  || MBA-I || 18.3 || data-sort-value="0.65" | 650 m || multiple || 2004–2019 || 05 Oct 2019 || 63 || align=left | Alt.: 2008 TF56 || 
|- id="2004 PN29" bgcolor=#d6d6d6
| 0 ||  || MBA-O || 16.47 || 2.8 km || multiple || 2004–2022 || 07 Jan 2022 || 134 || align=left | Alt.: 2010 OV65 || 
|- id="2004 PM30" bgcolor=#fefefe
| 1 ||  || HUN || 18.5 || data-sort-value="0.59" | 590 m || multiple || 2004–2020 || 06 Oct 2020 || 74 || align=left | Disc.: LINEARAdded on 13 September 2020 || 
|- id="2004 PT30" bgcolor=#E9E9E9
| – ||  || MBA-M || 17.3 || 1.5 km || single || 5 days || 13 Aug 2004 || 41 || align=left | — || 
|- id="2004 PV30" bgcolor=#fefefe
| 0 ||  || MBA-I || 17.8 || data-sort-value="0.82" | 820 m || multiple || 2004–2020 || 22 Mar 2020 || 98 || align=left | Alt.: 2006 BN253, 2013 CV213 || 
|- id="2004 PH32" bgcolor=#E9E9E9
| 0 ||  || MBA-M || 17.0 || 2.2 km || multiple || 2004–2019 || 17 Dec 2019 || 71 || align=left | Alt.: 2009 SZ141 || 
|- id="2004 PX32" bgcolor=#E9E9E9
| 1 ||  || MBA-M || 17.4 || 1.8 km || multiple || 2004–2018 || 12 Oct 2018 || 47 || align=left | Alt.: 2013 OP2 || 
|- id="2004 PK38" bgcolor=#FA8072
| 0 ||  || MCA || 18.04 || data-sort-value="0.73" | 730 m || multiple || 2000–2021 || 08 Apr 2021 || 80 || align=left | — || 
|- id="2004 PE41" bgcolor=#E9E9E9
| – ||  || MBA-M || 17.1 || 1.1 km || single || 10 days || 19 Aug 2004 || 12 || align=left | — || 
|- id="2004 PO41" bgcolor=#fefefe
| 0 ||  || MBA-I || 18.35 || data-sort-value="0.64" | 640 m || multiple || 2004–2021 || 11 Apr 2021 || 70 || align=left | Alt.: 2015 VB12 || 
|- id="2004 PQ41" bgcolor=#E9E9E9
| 0 ||  || MBA-M || 17.0 || 1.7 km || multiple || 2004–2020 || 21 Jan 2020 || 67 || align=left | Alt.: 2016 FD19 || 
|- id="2004 PR42" bgcolor=#FA8072
| – ||  || MCA || 20.5 || data-sort-value="0.24" | 240 m || single || 14 days || 22 Aug 2004 || 53 || align=left | — || 
|- id="2004 PS42" bgcolor=#FFC2E0
| 2 ||  || AMO || 21.3 || data-sort-value="0.20" | 200 m || multiple || 2004–2018 || 28 Nov 2018 || 85 || align=left | Potentially hazardous object || 
|- id="2004 PU42" bgcolor=#FFC2E0
| 6 ||  || APO || 26.7 || data-sort-value="0.016" | 16 m || single || 4 days || 14 Aug 2004 || 64 || align=left | — || 
|- id="2004 PB43" bgcolor=#E9E9E9
| 0 ||  || MBA-M || 16.52 || 2.1 km || multiple || 2003–2021 || 03 Dec 2021 || 334 || align=left | — || 
|- id="2004 PQ44" bgcolor=#fefefe
| 0 ||  || MBA-I || 19.14 || data-sort-value="0.44" | 440 m || multiple || 2004–2018 || 17 Nov 2018 || 54 || align=left | — || 
|- id="2004 PF45" bgcolor=#fefefe
| 0 ||  || MBA-I || 18.3 || data-sort-value="0.65" | 650 m || multiple || 2004–2018 || 18 Jun 2018 || 71 || align=left | — || 
|- id="2004 PQ46" bgcolor=#E9E9E9
| 0 ||  || MBA-M || 17.70 || 1.2 km || multiple || 2004–2021 || 30 Jul 2021 || 98 || align=left | — || 
|- id="2004 PN47" bgcolor=#fefefe
| 0 ||  || MBA-I || 18.0 || data-sort-value="0.75" | 750 m || multiple || 2004–2019 || 05 Jul 2019 || 44 || align=left | —Added on 22 July 2020 || 
|- id="2004 PY47" bgcolor=#E9E9E9
| 0 ||  || MBA-M || 16.58 || 2.0 km || multiple || 2000–2021 || 30 Oct 2021 || 391 || align=left | — || 
|- id="2004 PE49" bgcolor=#FA8072
| 0 ||  || MCA || 18.66 || data-sort-value="0.55" | 550 m || multiple || 2004–2021 || 30 Jun 2021 || 129 || align=left | Alt.: 2011 UN10 || 
|- id="2004 PK49" bgcolor=#E9E9E9
| 0 ||  || MBA-M || 17.48 || 1.8 km || multiple || 2004–2021 || 06 Apr 2021 || 78 || align=left | — || 
|- id="2004 PN49" bgcolor=#fefefe
| 0 ||  || MBA-I || 18.54 || data-sort-value="0.58" | 580 m || multiple || 2004–2021 || 28 Oct 2021 || 74 || align=left | Alt.: 2021 PD56 || 
|- id="2004 PV51" bgcolor=#fefefe
| 0 ||  || MBA-I || 17.7 || data-sort-value="0.86" | 860 m || multiple || 2004–2020 || 18 Dec 2020 || 134 || align=left | Alt.: 2015 FJ336 || 
|- id="2004 PE53" bgcolor=#d6d6d6
| 0 ||  || MBA-O || 17.05 || 2.2 km || multiple || 2002–2021 || 28 Nov 2021 || 123 || align=left | Alt.: 2015 PF201 || 
|- id="2004 PD54" bgcolor=#E9E9E9
| 0 ||  || MBA-M || 17.83 || data-sort-value="0.81" | 810 m || multiple || 2004–2021 || 09 Dec 2021 || 73 || align=left | — || 
|- id="2004 PS55" bgcolor=#fefefe
| 1 ||  || MBA-I || 18.5 || data-sort-value="0.59" | 590 m || multiple || 2001–2020 || 24 Nov 2020 || 43 || align=left | Disc.: LONEOSAdded on 17 January 2021 || 
|- id="2004 PH58" bgcolor=#FA8072
| 0 ||  || MCA || 18.81 || data-sort-value="0.51" | 510 m || multiple || 2000–2018 || 11 Jul 2018 || 82 || align=left | — || 
|- id="2004 PB59" bgcolor=#E9E9E9
| 0 ||  || MBA-M || 18.27 || data-sort-value="0.66" | 660 m || multiple || 2000–2021 || 26 Nov 2021 || 75 || align=left | Disc.: LINEARAdded on 21 August 2021 || 
|- id="2004 PD59" bgcolor=#E9E9E9
| 1 ||  || MBA-M || 18.1 || 1.0 km || multiple || 2004–2017 || 24 Oct 2017 || 38 || align=left | —Added on 22 July 2020Alt.: 2017 NC4 || 
|- id="2004 PE59" bgcolor=#d6d6d6
| 0 ||  || MBA-O || 17.0 || 2.2 km || multiple || 2004–2020 || 14 Sep 2020 || 103 || align=left | — || 
|- id="2004 PW59" bgcolor=#d6d6d6
| 0 ||  || MBA-O || 16.57 || 2.7 km || multiple || 1999–2021 || 23 Oct 2021 || 97 || align=left | Disc.: LONEOSAdded on 21 August 2021Alt.: 2010 NJ148 || 
|- id="2004 PX59" bgcolor=#E9E9E9
| 0 ||  || MBA-M || 16.3 || 3.1 km || multiple || 1994–2020 || 23 Dec 2020 || 157 || align=left | Alt.: 2013 LO33 || 
|- id="2004 PA60" bgcolor=#E9E9E9
| 0 ||  || MBA-M || 17.92 || 1.1 km || multiple || 2004–2021 || 09 Aug 2021 || 96 || align=left | — || 
|- id="2004 PL60" bgcolor=#d6d6d6
| 0 ||  || MBA-O || 16.59 || 2.7 km || multiple || 2004–2021 || 12 Dec 2021 || 247 || align=left | — || 
|- id="2004 PD62" bgcolor=#d6d6d6
| 0 ||  || MBA-O || 16.90 || 2.3 km || multiple || 2004–2021 || 03 Oct 2021 || 89 || align=left | —Added on 22 July 2020 || 
|- id="2004 PE62" bgcolor=#E9E9E9
| 1 ||  || MBA-M || 17.8 || data-sort-value="0.82" | 820 m || multiple || 2004–2020 || 17 Oct 2020 || 128 || align=left | Alt.: 2008 OZ13 || 
|- id="2004 PH62" bgcolor=#fefefe
| 1 ||  || MBA-I || 18.0 || data-sort-value="0.75" | 750 m || multiple || 2004–2019 || 15 Nov 2019 || 59 || align=left | — || 
|- id="2004 PQ62" bgcolor=#d6d6d6
| 0 ||  || MBA-O || 16.1 || 3.4 km || multiple || 2004–2021 || 02 Oct 2021 || 144 || align=left | —Added on 22 July 2020Alt.: 2010 LW48 || 
|- id="2004 PF63" bgcolor=#E9E9E9
| 0 ||  || MBA-M || 18.06 || data-sort-value="0.73" | 730 m || multiple || 2004–2021 || 03 Dec 2021 || 47 || align=left | — || 
|- id="2004 PF64" bgcolor=#d6d6d6
| 0 ||  || MBA-O || 17.42 || 1.8 km || multiple || 2004–2020 || 23 Oct 2020 || 52 || align=left | Disc.: LINEARAdded on 21 August 2021Alt.: 2020 SD83 || 
|- id="2004 PB66" bgcolor=#d6d6d6
| 5 ||  || MBA-O || 17.5 || 1.8 km || single || 59 days || 09 Sep 2004 || 25 || align=left | — || 
|- id="2004 PK66" bgcolor=#fefefe
| 0 ||  || MBA-I || 17.79 || data-sort-value="0.82" | 820 m || multiple || 2003–2021 || 07 Apr 2021 || 109 || align=left | Alt.: 2015 TY51 || 
|- id="2004 PO66" bgcolor=#E9E9E9
| 0 ||  || MBA-M || 16.2 || 3.2 km || multiple || 2004–2020 || 24 Mar 2020 || 121 || align=left | — || 
|- id="2004 PR66" bgcolor=#E9E9E9
| 9 ||  || MBA-M || 18.96 || data-sort-value="0.90" | 900 m || single || 4 days || 12 Aug 2004 || 11 || align=left | Disc.: CINEOSAdded on 21 August 2021 || 
|- id="2004 PS66" bgcolor=#fefefe
| 2 ||  || MBA-I || 17.9 || data-sort-value="0.78" | 780 m || multiple || 2004–2020 || 23 Jan 2020 || 59 || align=left | — || 
|- id="2004 PD67" bgcolor=#FA8072
| 0 ||  || MCA || 19.39 || data-sort-value="0.39" | 390 m || multiple || 2004–2017 || 16 Nov 2017 || 125 || align=left | — || 
|- id="2004 PT68" bgcolor=#E9E9E9
| 0 ||  || MBA-M || 17.18 || 1.5 km || multiple || 2004–2021 || 01 Nov 2021 || 332 || align=left | — || 
|- id="2004 PU68" bgcolor=#fefefe
| 0 ||  || MBA-I || 18.7 || data-sort-value="0.54" | 540 m || multiple || 2004–2020 || 10 Nov 2020 || 162 || align=left | Alt.: 2013 HD45 || 
|- id="2004 PP70" bgcolor=#E9E9E9
| 0 ||  || MBA-M || 17.87 || data-sort-value="0.79" | 790 m || multiple || 2000–2021 || 25 Nov 2021 || 118 || align=left | Alt.: 2017 XD21 || 
|- id="2004 PV75" bgcolor=#E9E9E9
| 0 ||  || MBA-M || 17.39 || data-sort-value="0.99" | 990 m || multiple || 2004–2022 || 05 Jan 2022 || 119 || align=left | — || 
|- id="2004 PX75" bgcolor=#d6d6d6
| 0 ||  || MBA-O || 17.2 || 2.0 km || multiple || 2004–2020 || 24 Dec 2020 || 235 || align=left | — || 
|- id="2004 PN78" bgcolor=#d6d6d6
| 0 ||  || MBA-O || 16.9 || 2.3 km || multiple || 2004–2020 || 17 Dec 2020 || 100 || align=left | — || 
|- id="2004 PR78" bgcolor=#d6d6d6
| 0 ||  || MBA-O || 16.84 || 2.4 km || multiple || 2004–2021 || 06 Nov 2021 || 111 || align=left | Alt.: 2010 NZ68 || 
|- id="2004 PP79" bgcolor=#E9E9E9
| 1 ||  || MBA-M || 18.00 || data-sort-value="0.75" | 750 m || multiple || 2004–2021 || 06 Dec 2021 || 69 || align=left | — || 
|- id="2004 PA80" bgcolor=#d6d6d6
| 0 ||  || MBA-O || 17.43 || 1.8 km || multiple || 2004–2021 || 31 Oct 2021 || 110 || align=left | Alt.: 2021 PF4 || 
|- id="2004 PL80" bgcolor=#fefefe
| 0 ||  || MBA-I || 18.29 || data-sort-value="0.65" | 650 m || multiple || 2004–2021 || 17 Apr 2021 || 79 || align=left | — || 
|- id="2004 PV80" bgcolor=#fefefe
| 0 ||  || MBA-I || 17.9 || data-sort-value="0.78" | 780 m || multiple || 2004–2018 || 07 Mar 2018 || 67 || align=left | Alt.: 2015 LG9 || 
|- id="2004 PC82" bgcolor=#E9E9E9
| 0 ||  || MBA-M || 17.99 || data-sort-value="0.75" | 750 m || multiple || 2004–2021 || 29 Nov 2021 || 50 || align=left | — || 
|- id="2004 PC83" bgcolor=#E9E9E9
| 1 ||  || MBA-M || 17.4 || data-sort-value="0.98" | 980 m || multiple || 2004–2020 || 20 Jul 2020 || 62 || align=left | —Added on 22 July 2020Alt.: 2008 PC16, 2020 HY29 || 
|- id="2004 PD86" bgcolor=#FA8072
| 0 ||  || MCA || 18.7 || data-sort-value="0.54" | 540 m || multiple || 2004–2020 || 23 Jun 2020 || 63 || align=left | — || 
|- id="2004 PO86" bgcolor=#fefefe
| 0 ||  || MBA-I || 19.13 || data-sort-value="0.44" | 440 m || multiple || 2004–2021 || 08 Nov 2021 || 56 || align=left | Alt.: 2021 RR52 || 
|- id="2004 PR87" bgcolor=#d6d6d6
| 0 ||  || MBA-O || 16.8 || 2.4 km || multiple || 1999–2020 || 14 Dec 2020 || 96 || align=left | — || 
|- id="2004 PV87" bgcolor=#E9E9E9
| 0 ||  || MBA-M || 16.7 || 2.5 km || multiple || 2004–2019 || 24 Dec 2019 || 117 || align=left | Alt.: 2016 BW65 || 
|- id="2004 PF88" bgcolor=#E9E9E9
| 0 ||  || MBA-M || 17.71 || 1.2 km || multiple || 2004–2021 || 05 Oct 2021 || 146 || align=left | — || 
|- id="2004 PC91" bgcolor=#E9E9E9
| 1 ||  || MBA-M || 18.1 || data-sort-value="0.71" | 710 m || multiple || 2004–2020 || 06 Dec 2020 || 125 || align=left | — || 
|- id="2004 PQ92" bgcolor=#E9E9E9
| – ||  || MBA-M || 17.9 || data-sort-value="0.78" | 780 m || single || 59 days || 10 Oct 2004 || 46 || align=left | — || 
|- id="2004 PR92" bgcolor=#FFC2E0
| 8 ||  || APO || 25.1 || data-sort-value="0.034" | 34 m || single || 8 days || 19 Aug 2004 || 49 || align=left | — || 
|- id="2004 PS92" bgcolor=#FFC2E0
| 3 ||  || AMO || 18.9 || data-sort-value="0.59" | 590 m || multiple || 2004–2012 || 09 May 2012 || 65 || align=left | — || 
|- id="2004 PO93" bgcolor=#d6d6d6
| 1 ||  || MBA-O || 17.3 || 1.9 km || multiple || 1999–2019 || 03 Nov 2019 || 55 || align=left | — || 
|- id="2004 PD95" bgcolor=#fefefe
| 0 ||  || MBA-I || 17.9 || data-sort-value="0.78" | 780 m || multiple || 1993–2019 || 27 Nov 2019 || 106 || align=left | — || 
|- id="2004 PJ95" bgcolor=#fefefe
| 0 ||  || MBA-I || 18.76 || data-sort-value="0.53" | 530 m || multiple || 2004–2021 || 11 May 2021 || 70 || align=left | Alt.: 2014 GE21 || 
|- id="2004 PO95" bgcolor=#d6d6d6
| – ||  || MBA-O || 17.7 || 1.6 km || single || 16 days || 26 Aug 2004 || 10 || align=left | — || 
|- id="2004 PW95" bgcolor=#fefefe
| 0 ||  || MBA-I || 18.01 || data-sort-value="0.74" | 740 m || multiple || 2004–2021 || 12 May 2021 || 122 || align=left | Alt.: 2013 BR12, 2014 HX129, 2015 VQ124 || 
|- id="2004 PF96" bgcolor=#fefefe
| 0 ||  || MBA-I || 18.43 || data-sort-value="0.61" | 610 m || multiple || 2003–2021 || 15 Apr 2021 || 53 || align=left | — || 
|- id="2004 PR96" bgcolor=#E9E9E9
| 0 ||  || MBA-M || 18.09 || 1.0 km || multiple || 2004–2021 || 24 Oct 2021 || 71 || align=left | Disc.: CINEOSAdded on 21 August 2021 || 
|- id="2004 PB97" bgcolor=#FFC2E0
| 6 ||  || AMO || 25.3 || data-sort-value="0.031" | 31 m || single || 13 days || 24 Aug 2004 || 20 || align=left | — || 
|- id="2004 PD97" bgcolor=#FFC2E0
| 5 ||  || AMO || 21.6 || data-sort-value="0.17" | 170 m || single || 58 days || 09 Oct 2004 || 29 || align=left | — || 
|- id="2004 PE97" bgcolor=#FA8072
| 1 ||  || MCA || 18.9 || data-sort-value="0.49" | 490 m || multiple || 2004–2018 || 08 Aug 2018 || 100 || align=left | — || 
|- id="2004 PF97" bgcolor=#E9E9E9
| 0 ||  || MBA-M || 17.61 || 1.3 km || multiple || 2004–2021 || 27 Nov 2021 || 285 || align=left | — || 
|- id="2004 PQ99" bgcolor=#d6d6d6
| 0 ||  || MBA-O || 16.4 || 2.9 km || multiple || 2004–2021 || 01 Oct 2021 || 99 || align=left | Alt.: 2010 MZ31 || 
|- id="2004 PO100" bgcolor=#E9E9E9
| E ||  || MBA-M || 18.3 || data-sort-value="0.65" | 650 m || single || 21 days || 01 Sep 2004 || 11 || align=left | — || 
|- id="2004 PT104" bgcolor=#fefefe
| 0 ||  || MBA-I || 18.41 || data-sort-value="0.62" | 620 m || multiple || 2004–2021 || 15 Apr 2021 || 42 || align=left | Alt.: 2015 RU286 || 
|- id="2004 PU104" bgcolor=#d6d6d6
| 1 ||  || MBA-O || 16.9 || 2.3 km || multiple || 2004–2020 || 25 Jan 2020 || 236 || align=left | Alt.: 2009 QF54 || 
|- id="2004 PU106" bgcolor=#d6d6d6
| 0 ||  || MBA-O || 17.4 || 1.8 km || multiple || 2004–2019 || 05 Oct 2019 || 59 || align=left | — || 
|- id="2004 PY106" bgcolor=#fefefe
| 3 ||  || MBA-I || 18.9 || data-sort-value="0.49" | 490 m || multiple || 2004–2019 || 29 Nov 2019 || 24 || align=left | —Added on 22 July 2020 || 
|- id="2004 PP107" bgcolor=#FA8072
| 0 ||  || MCA || 17.27 || 1.8 km || multiple || 2004–2020 || 14 Oct 2020 || 85 || align=left | — || 
|- id="2004 PS107" bgcolor=#C2E0FF
| 3 ||  || TNO || 7.6 || 126 km || multiple || 2004–2014 || 29 Jul 2014 || 12 || align=left | LoUTNOs, other TNO || 
|- id="2004 PU107" bgcolor=#C2E0FF
| E ||  || TNO || 6.7 || 157 km || single || 29 days || 11 Sep 2004 || 5 || align=left | LoUTNOs, cubewano? || 
|- id="2004 PV107" bgcolor=#C2E0FF
| E ||  || TNO || 5.9 || 275 km || single || 1 day || 14 Aug 2004 || 3 || align=left | LoUTNOs, other TNO || 
|- id="2004 PW107" bgcolor=#C2E0FF
| 3 ||  || TNO || 7.05 || 141 km || multiple || 2003–2021 || 12 Sep 2021 || 137 || align=left | LoUTNOs, res4:7, BR-mag: 1.81; taxonomy: RR-IR || 
|- id="2004 PX107" bgcolor=#C2E0FF
| 3 ||  || TNO || 7.26 || 117 km || multiple || 2003–2021 || 12 Sep 2021 || 20 || align=left | LoUTNOs, cubewano (cold) || 
|- id="2004 PY107" bgcolor=#C2E0FF
| 2 ||  || TNO || 6.45 || 170 km || multiple || 2004–2021 || 09 Aug 2021 || 129 || align=left | LoUTNOs, cubewano (cold) || 
|- id="2004 PZ107" bgcolor=#C2E0FF
| 4 ||  || TNO || 7.67 || 100 km || multiple || 2004–2021 || 09 Jul 2021 || 19 || align=left | LoUTNOs, cubewano? || 
|- id="2004 PA108" bgcolor=#C2E0FF
| 4 ||  || TNO || 6.96 || 135 km || multiple || 2004–2017 || 15 Nov 2017 || 20 || align=left | LoUTNOs, cubewano (cold) || 
|- id="2004 PB108" bgcolor=#C2E0FF
| 4 ||  || TNO || 6.50 || 243 km || multiple || 2004–2021 || 12 Sep 2021 || 47 || align=left | LoUTNOs, other TNO, albedo: 0.035; binary: 132 km || 
|- id="2004 PJ108" bgcolor=#fefefe
| 0 ||  || MBA-I || 18.43 || data-sort-value="0.61" | 610 m || multiple || 2004–2021 || 24 Nov 2021 || 75 || align=left | — || 
|- id="2004 PS108" bgcolor=#E9E9E9
| 0 ||  || MBA-M || 17.09 || 1.1 km || multiple || 2000–2022 || 25 Jan 2022 || 83 || align=left | — || 
|- id="2004 PJ109" bgcolor=#fefefe
| 1 ||  || MBA-I || 18.2 || data-sort-value="0.68" | 680 m || multiple || 2004–2018 || 14 Jun 2018 || 62 || align=left | Alt.: 2008 UN247 || 
|- id="2004 PA110" bgcolor=#fefefe
| 3 ||  || MBA-I || 18.5 || data-sort-value="0.59" | 590 m || multiple || 2004–2015 || 18 Nov 2015 || 22 || align=left | — || 
|- id="2004 PD110" bgcolor=#E9E9E9
| 0 ||  || MBA-M || 17.97 || 1.1 km || multiple || 2004–2021 || 31 Aug 2021 || 89 || align=left | Alt.: 2005 WY197, 2015 BJ424 || 
|- id="2004 PX110" bgcolor=#E9E9E9
| 2 ||  || MBA-M || 17.5 || data-sort-value="0.94" | 940 m || multiple || 2004–2019 || 05 Feb 2019 || 34 || align=left | — || 
|- id="2004 PY111" bgcolor=#C2E0FF
| E ||  || TNO || 6.6 || 164 km || single || 32 days || 13 Sep 2004 || 4 || align=left | LoUTNOs, cubewano? || 
|- id="2004 PZ111" bgcolor=#C2E0FF
| E ||  || TNO || 7.1 || 130 km || single || 32 days || 13 Sep 2004 || 4 || align=left | LoUTNOs, cubewano? || 
|- id="2004 PA112" bgcolor=#C2E0FF
| 3 ||  || TNO || 7.48 || 151 km || multiple || 2004–2021 || 03 Oct 2021 || 58 || align=left | LoUTNOs, plutino? || 
|- id="2004 PC112" bgcolor=#C2E0FF
| E ||  || TNO || — || 55 km || single || 29 days || 11 Sep 2004 || 4 || align=left | LoUTNOs, cubewano? || 
|- id="2004 PD112" bgcolor=#C2E0FF
| 5 ||  || TNO || 6.29 || 180 km || multiple || 2004-2011 || 03 Sep 2011 || 17 || align=left | LoUTNOs, SDO || 
|- id="2004 PE112" bgcolor=#C2E0FF
| E ||  || TNO || 6.7 || 157 km || single || 31 days || 13 Sep 2004 || 4 || align=left | LoUTNOs, cubewano? || 
|- id="2004 PF112" bgcolor=#C2E0FF
| E ||  || TNO || 6.7 || 157 km || single || 30 days || 13 Sep 2004 || 4 || align=left | LoUTNOs, cubewano? || 
|- id="2004 PS113" bgcolor=#E9E9E9
| 0 ||  || MBA-M || 17.99 || 1.1 km || multiple || 2004–2021 || 14 Sep 2021 || 70 || align=left | Alt.: 2017 SQ7 || 
|- id="2004 PG114" bgcolor=#E9E9E9
| 0 ||  || MBA-M || 17.4 || 1.8 km || multiple || 2004–2018 || 13 Dec 2018 || 59 || align=left | — || 
|- id="2004 PQ114" bgcolor=#fefefe
| 2 ||  || MBA-I || 17.5 || data-sort-value="0.94" | 940 m || multiple || 2004–2019 || 30 Nov 2019 || 107 || align=left | — || 
|- id="2004 PV114" bgcolor=#E9E9E9
| 2 ||  || MBA-M || 18.6 || 1.1 km || multiple || 2004–2018 || 12 Oct 2018 || 29 || align=left | — || 
|- id="2004 PY114" bgcolor=#d6d6d6
| 0 ||  || MBA-O || 17.16 || 2.1 km || multiple || 2004–2021 || 05 Dec 2021 || 74 || align=left | — || 
|- id="2004 PZ115" bgcolor=#d6d6d6
| 2 ||  || MBA-O || 17.14 || 2.1 km || multiple || 2004–2021 || 03 Aug 2021 || 25 || align=left | — || 
|- id="2004 PC116" bgcolor=#fefefe
| 0 ||  || MBA-I || 18.20 || data-sort-value="0.68" | 680 m || multiple || 2004–2021 || 13 Apr 2021 || 98 || align=left | — || 
|- id="2004 PJ116" bgcolor=#E9E9E9
| 1 ||  || MBA-M || 18.71 || data-sort-value="0.54" | 540 m || multiple || 2004–2021 || 04 Oct 2021 || 21 || align=left | Disc.: Mauna Kea Obs.Added on 11 May 2021Alt.: 2020 HY82 || 
|- id="2004 PO116" bgcolor=#d6d6d6
| 0 ||  || MBA-O || 17.49 || 1.8 km || multiple || 2004–2021 || 30 Nov 2021 || 52 || align=left | Disc.: Mauna KeaAdded on 24 December 2021 || 
|- id="2004 PQ116" bgcolor=#d6d6d6
| 2 ||  || MBA-O || 17.4 || 1.8 km || multiple || 2004–2020 || 14 Sep 2020 || 42 || align=left | — || 
|- id="2004 PU116" bgcolor=#d6d6d6
| 2 ||  || MBA-O || 17.8 || 1.5 km || multiple || 2004–2021 || 18 Jan 2021 || 27 || align=left | — || 
|- id="2004 PX116" bgcolor=#fefefe
| 1 ||  || MBA-I || 18.9 || data-sort-value="0.49" | 490 m || multiple || 2003–2018 || 16 May 2018 || 32 || align=left | — || 
|- id="2004 PY116" bgcolor=#d6d6d6
| 0 ||  || MBA-O || 17.4 || 1.8 km || multiple || 2004–2020 || 16 Oct 2020 || 32 || align=left | — || 
|- id="2004 PZ116" bgcolor=#E9E9E9
| 0 ||  || MBA-M || 18.0 || 1.4 km || multiple || 2004–2018 || 13 Dec 2018 || 37 || align=left | Alt.: 2009 WS48 || 
|- id="2004 PR117" bgcolor=#E9E9E9
| 0 ||  || MBA-M || 16.9 || 1.8 km || multiple || 2004–2021 || 11 Jun 2021 || 106 || align=left | Alt.: 2012 HZ25 || 
|- id="2004 PT117" bgcolor=#C2E0FF
| 3 ||  || TNO || 6.7 || 152 km || multiple || 2004–2013 || 06 Oct 2013 || 19 || align=left | LoUTNOs, cubewano (cold) || 
|- id="2004 PU117" bgcolor=#C2E0FF
| 4 ||  || TNO || 6.92 || 137 km || multiple || 2004–2021 || 12 Sep 2021 || 20 || align=left | LoUTNOs, cubewano (cold) || 
|- id="2004 PV117" bgcolor=#C2E0FF
| 2 ||  || TNO || 6.5 || 167 km || multiple || 2004–2013 || 08 Jun 2013 || 29 || align=left | LoUTNOs, cubewano (cold), binary: 89 km || 
|- id="2004 PW117" bgcolor=#C2E0FF
| 3 ||  || TNO || 6.35 || 178 km || multiple || 2004–2021 || 09 Jul 2021 || 23 || align=left | LoUTNOs, cubewano (cold), binary: 139 km || 
|- id="2004 PX117" bgcolor=#C2E0FF
| 3 ||  || TNO || 6.5 || 167 km || multiple || 2004–2013 || 07 Oct 2013 || 17 || align=left | LoUTNOs, cubewano (cold), binary: 139 km || 
|- id="2004 PY117" bgcolor=#C2E0FF
| 2 ||  || TNO || 7.17 || 153 km || multiple || 2004–2021 || 13 Sep 2021 || 111 || align=left | LoUTNOs, other TNO || 
|- id="2004 PC118" bgcolor=#E9E9E9
| 0 ||  || MBA-M || 16.89 || 1.2 km || multiple || 2004–2021 || 30 Nov 2021 || 177 || align=left | — || 
|- id="2004 PD118" bgcolor=#d6d6d6
| 0 ||  || MBA-O || 16.06 || 3.4 km || multiple || 1998–2021 || 01 Oct 2021 || 160 || align=left | — || 
|- id="2004 PE118" bgcolor=#fefefe
| 0 ||  || MBA-I || 17.6 || data-sort-value="0.90" | 900 m || multiple || 2004–2020 || 11 Nov 2020 || 137 || align=left | — || 
|- id="2004 PF118" bgcolor=#fefefe
| 0 ||  || MBA-I || 17.9 || data-sort-value="0.78" | 780 m || multiple || 2004–2021 || 12 Jun 2021 || 138 || align=left | — || 
|- id="2004 PG118" bgcolor=#fefefe
| 0 ||  || MBA-I || 18.28 || data-sort-value="0.66" | 660 m || multiple || 2004–2021 || 06 Nov 2021 || 156 || align=left | — || 
|- id="2004 PJ118" bgcolor=#E9E9E9
| 0 ||  || MBA-M || 17.4 || 1.8 km || multiple || 2004–2020 || 02 Feb 2020 || 92 || align=left | — || 
|- id="2004 PL118" bgcolor=#fefefe
| 0 ||  || MBA-I || 17.7 || data-sort-value="0.86" | 860 m || multiple || 2004–2019 || 24 Dec 2019 || 86 || align=left | — || 
|- id="2004 PM118" bgcolor=#d6d6d6
| 0 ||  || MBA-O || 16.61 || 2.7 km || multiple || 2004–2021 || 16 Oct 2021 || 113 || align=left | — || 
|- id="2004 PO118" bgcolor=#fefefe
| 0 ||  || MBA-I || 17.6 || data-sort-value="0.90" | 900 m || multiple || 2004–2020 || 20 Dec 2020 || 98 || align=left | — || 
|- id="2004 PP118" bgcolor=#E9E9E9
| 0 ||  || MBA-M || 16.73 || 1.3 km || multiple || 2004–2022 || 06 Jan 2022 || 136 || align=left | — || 
|- id="2004 PR118" bgcolor=#E9E9E9
| 0 ||  || MBA-M || 17.4 || 1.8 km || multiple || 1995–2021 || 15 Apr 2021 || 85 || align=left | Alt.: 2009 TA37 || 
|- id="2004 PS118" bgcolor=#d6d6d6
| 0 ||  || MBA-O || 16.55 || 2.7 km || multiple || 2004–2021 || 31 Aug 2021 || 65 || align=left | — || 
|- id="2004 PT118" bgcolor=#E9E9E9
| 1 ||  || MBA-M || 17.6 || 1.3 km || multiple || 2004–2019 || 05 Feb 2019 || 52 || align=left | — || 
|- id="2004 PU118" bgcolor=#E9E9E9
| 0 ||  || MBA-M || 17.5 || 1.8 km || multiple || 2004–2018 || 14 Sep 2018 || 51 || align=left | — || 
|- id="2004 PV118" bgcolor=#fefefe
| 1 ||  || MBA-I || 18.6 || data-sort-value="0.57" | 570 m || multiple || 2004–2020 || 05 Dec 2020 || 54 || align=left | — || 
|- id="2004 PW118" bgcolor=#d6d6d6
| 0 ||  || MBA-O || 16.40 || 2.9 km || multiple || 2004–2021 || 30 Oct 2021 || 119 || align=left | Alt.: 2010 OP28 || 
|- id="2004 PX118" bgcolor=#fefefe
| 1 ||  || MBA-I || 19.2 || data-sort-value="0.43" | 430 m || multiple || 2004–2020 || 08 Oct 2020 || 57 || align=left | — || 
|- id="2004 PY118" bgcolor=#fefefe
| 0 ||  || MBA-I || 18.4 || data-sort-value="0.62" | 620 m || multiple || 2004–2020 || 14 Jan 2020 || 58 || align=left | — || 
|- id="2004 PA119" bgcolor=#fefefe
| 0 ||  || MBA-I || 18.2 || data-sort-value="0.68" | 680 m || multiple || 2004–2019 || 20 Sep 2019 || 45 || align=left | — || 
|- id="2004 PB119" bgcolor=#d6d6d6
| 0 ||  || MBA-O || 17.05 || 2.2 km || multiple || 2004–2021 || 08 Sep 2021 || 59 || align=left | — || 
|- id="2004 PD119" bgcolor=#E9E9E9
| 0 ||  || MBA-M || 17.86 || 1.1 km || multiple || 2004–2021 || 31 Oct 2021 || 67 || align=left | — || 
|- id="2004 PF119" bgcolor=#fefefe
| 0 ||  || MBA-I || 17.8 || data-sort-value="0.82" | 820 m || multiple || 1993–2019 || 24 Dec 2019 || 73 || align=left | — || 
|- id="2004 PG119" bgcolor=#d6d6d6
| 2 ||  || MBA-O || 17.2 || 2.0 km || multiple || 2004–2019 || 06 Sep 2019 || 53 || align=left | — || 
|- id="2004 PL119" bgcolor=#E9E9E9
| 0 ||  || MBA-M || 17.88 || 1.1 km || multiple || 2000–2021 || 31 Aug 2021 || 51 || align=left | — || 
|- id="2004 PM119" bgcolor=#E9E9E9
| 0 ||  || MBA-M || 18.12 || 1.0 km || multiple || 2004–2021 || 05 Jul 2021 || 30 || align=left | — || 
|- id="2004 PN119" bgcolor=#E9E9E9
| 0 ||  || MBA-M || 18.13 || data-sort-value="0.99" | 990 m || multiple || 2004–2022 || 21 Jan 2022 || 172 || align=left | — || 
|- id="2004 PO119" bgcolor=#E9E9E9
| 0 ||  || MBA-M || 17.91 || 1.1 km || multiple || 2004–2021 || 08 Sep 2021 || 61 || align=left | — || 
|- id="2004 PP119" bgcolor=#fefefe
| 0 ||  || MBA-I || 17.8 || data-sort-value="0.82" | 820 m || multiple || 2004–2021 || 16 Jan 2021 || 52 || align=left | — || 
|- id="2004 PQ119" bgcolor=#E9E9E9
| 0 ||  || MBA-M || 18.05 || 1.0 km || multiple || 2004–2021 || 13 Sep 2021 || 53 || align=left | — || 
|- id="2004 PR119" bgcolor=#E9E9E9
| 0 ||  || MBA-M || 18.89 || data-sort-value="0.70" | 700 m || multiple || 2004–2021 || 27 Nov 2021 || 84 || align=left | — || 
|- id="2004 PS119" bgcolor=#fefefe
| 0 ||  || MBA-I || 19.24 || data-sort-value="0.42" | 420 m || multiple || 2004–2021 || 11 Nov 2021 || 41 || align=left | — || 
|- id="2004 PT119" bgcolor=#fefefe
| 0 ||  || MBA-I || 18.8 || data-sort-value="0.52" | 520 m || multiple || 2004–2020 || 26 Jan 2020 || 23 || align=left | — || 
|- id="2004 PU119" bgcolor=#E9E9E9
| 0 ||  || MBA-M || 16.9 || 2.3 km || multiple || 2004–2021 || 07 Jan 2021 || 89 || align=left | — || 
|- id="2004 PV119" bgcolor=#fefefe
| 0 ||  || MBA-I || 18.4 || data-sort-value="0.62" | 620 m || multiple || 2004–2020 || 16 Oct 2020 || 107 || align=left | — || 
|- id="2004 PW119" bgcolor=#fefefe
| 0 ||  || MBA-I || 18.0 || data-sort-value="0.75" | 750 m || multiple || 2004–2019 || 28 Dec 2019 || 70 || align=left | — || 
|- id="2004 PX119" bgcolor=#E9E9E9
| 0 ||  || MBA-M || 17.0 || 2.2 km || multiple || 2004–2019 || 03 Dec 2019 || 71 || align=left | — || 
|- id="2004 PZ119" bgcolor=#E9E9E9
| 0 ||  || MBA-M || 17.60 || 1.7 km || multiple || 2004–2021 || 13 May 2021 || 89 || align=left | — || 
|- id="2004 PA120" bgcolor=#d6d6d6
| 0 ||  || MBA-O || 16.2 || 3.2 km || multiple || 2004–2021 || 03 Jan 2021 || 71 || align=left | — || 
|- id="2004 PB120" bgcolor=#d6d6d6
| 0 ||  || MBA-O || 17.0 || 2.2 km || multiple || 2004–2020 || 24 Jun 2020 || 84 || align=left | — || 
|- id="2004 PC120" bgcolor=#fefefe
| 0 ||  || MBA-I || 18.53 || data-sort-value="0.58" | 580 m || multiple || 2004–2021 || 15 Apr 2021 || 60 || align=left | — || 
|- id="2004 PD120" bgcolor=#E9E9E9
| 0 ||  || MBA-M || 17.6 || 1.3 km || multiple || 2004–2020 || 03 Feb 2020 || 61 || align=left | — || 
|- id="2004 PE120" bgcolor=#d6d6d6
| 0 ||  || MBA-O || 17.0 || 2.2 km || multiple || 2004–2019 || 28 Nov 2019 || 67 || align=left | — || 
|- id="2004 PF120" bgcolor=#E9E9E9
| 0 ||  || MBA-M || 17.1 || 2.1 km || multiple || 2004–2019 || 20 Dec 2019 || 57 || align=left | — || 
|- id="2004 PG120" bgcolor=#fefefe
| 0 ||  || MBA-I || 17.9 || data-sort-value="0.78" | 780 m || multiple || 2004–2019 || 26 Sep 2019 || 53 || align=left | — || 
|- id="2004 PH120" bgcolor=#fefefe
| 0 ||  || MBA-I || 18.7 || data-sort-value="0.54" | 540 m || multiple || 2004–2019 || 10 Jun 2019 || 37 || align=left | — || 
|- id="2004 PJ120" bgcolor=#d6d6d6
| 0 ||  || MBA-O || 17.03 || 2.2 km || multiple || 2004–2021 || 29 Oct 2021 || 56 || align=left | — || 
|- id="2004 PK120" bgcolor=#fefefe
| 1 ||  || MBA-I || 19.1 || data-sort-value="0.45" | 450 m || multiple || 2004–2019 || 26 Nov 2019 || 36 || align=left | — || 
|- id="2004 PL120" bgcolor=#fefefe
| 0 ||  || MBA-I || 19.13 || data-sort-value="0.44" | 440 m || multiple || 2004–2021 || 02 Dec 2021 || 56 || align=left | — || 
|- id="2004 PM120" bgcolor=#fefefe
| 0 ||  || MBA-I || 18.4 || data-sort-value="0.62" | 620 m || multiple || 2004–2019 || 03 Oct 2019 || 55 || align=left | — || 
|- id="2004 PN120" bgcolor=#fefefe
| 1 ||  || MBA-I || 18.7 || data-sort-value="0.54" | 540 m || multiple || 2004–2021 || 16 Jan 2021 || 51 || align=left | — || 
|- id="2004 PO120" bgcolor=#E9E9E9
| 0 ||  || MBA-M || 17.5 || 1.8 km || multiple || 2004–2019 || 03 Dec 2019 || 51 || align=left | — || 
|- id="2004 PP120" bgcolor=#fefefe
| 1 ||  || MBA-I || 18.6 || data-sort-value="0.57" | 570 m || multiple || 2004–2019 || 22 Oct 2019 || 42 || align=left | — || 
|- id="2004 PQ120" bgcolor=#E9E9E9
| 1 ||  || MBA-M || 17.5 || 1.8 km || multiple || 2004–2019 || 05 Nov 2019 || 44 || align=left | — || 
|- id="2004 PR120" bgcolor=#d6d6d6
| 0 ||  || MBA-O || 17.5 || 1.8 km || multiple || 2003–2020 || 16 Aug 2020 || 52 || align=left | Alt.: 2008 FD89 || 
|- id="2004 PS120" bgcolor=#d6d6d6
| 0 ||  || MBA-O || 15.83 || 3.8 km || multiple || 2004–2021 || 25 Oct 2021 || 115 || align=left | Alt.: 2010 LY155 || 
|- id="2004 PT120" bgcolor=#fefefe
| 0 ||  || MBA-I || 18.83 || data-sort-value="0.51" | 510 m || multiple || 2004–2021 || 31 Oct 2021 || 65 || align=left | — || 
|- id="2004 PU120" bgcolor=#E9E9E9
| 1 ||  || MBA-M || 17.4 || 1.8 km || multiple || 2004–2018 || 14 Aug 2018 || 25 || align=left | — || 
|- id="2004 PV120" bgcolor=#fefefe
| 0 ||  || MBA-I || 18.0 || data-sort-value="0.75" | 750 m || multiple || 2004–2019 || 30 Sep 2019 || 51 || align=left | — || 
|- id="2004 PW120" bgcolor=#fefefe
| 0 ||  || MBA-I || 17.66 || data-sort-value="0.87" | 870 m || multiple || 2004–2021 || 07 Apr 2021 || 142 || align=left | Alt.: 2010 JR207 || 
|- id="2004 PY120" bgcolor=#d6d6d6
| 0 ||  || MBA-O || 17.05 || 2.2 km || multiple || 2004–2021 || 25 Nov 2021 || 81 || align=left | — || 
|- id="2004 PZ120" bgcolor=#E9E9E9
| 0 ||  || MBA-M || 17.84 || 1.5 km || multiple || 2004–2021 || 09 May 2021 || 62 || align=left | — || 
|- id="2004 PA121" bgcolor=#d6d6d6
| 0 ||  || MBA-O || 17.2 || 2.0 km || multiple || 2004–2019 || 09 May 2019 || 51 || align=left | — || 
|- id="2004 PB121" bgcolor=#E9E9E9
| 0 ||  || MBA-M || 18.3 || data-sort-value="0.92" | 920 m || multiple || 2004–2019 || 13 Jan 2019 || 41 || align=left | — || 
|- id="2004 PC121" bgcolor=#fefefe
| 0 ||  || MBA-I || 18.1 || data-sort-value="0.71" | 710 m || multiple || 2004–2021 || 15 Jan 2021 || 46 || align=left | — || 
|- id="2004 PD121" bgcolor=#fefefe
| 1 ||  || MBA-I || 18.9 || data-sort-value="0.49" | 490 m || multiple || 2004–2019 || 03 Oct 2019 || 32 || align=left | — || 
|- id="2004 PE121" bgcolor=#E9E9E9
| 2 ||  || MBA-M || 18.5 || data-sort-value="0.59" | 590 m || multiple || 2004–2019 || 08 Feb 2019 || 38 || align=left | — || 
|- id="2004 PF121" bgcolor=#d6d6d6
| 0 ||  || MBA-O || 16.55 || 2.7 km || multiple || 2004–2021 || 07 Aug 2021 || 82 || align=left | Alt.: 2010 MS23 || 
|- id="2004 PG121" bgcolor=#d6d6d6
| 0 ||  || MBA-O || 17.34 || 1.9 km || multiple || 2004–2021 || 12 Aug 2021 || 30 || align=left | — || 
|- id="2004 PH121" bgcolor=#fefefe
| 0 ||  || MBA-I || 18.3 || data-sort-value="0.65" | 650 m || multiple || 2004–2019 || 08 Oct 2019 || 48 || align=left | — || 
|- id="2004 PJ121" bgcolor=#fefefe
| 0 ||  || MBA-I || 19.32 || data-sort-value="0.41" | 410 m || multiple || 2004–2021 || 09 Sep 2021 || 93 || align=left | — || 
|- id="2004 PK121" bgcolor=#fefefe
| 0 ||  || MBA-I || 19.3 || data-sort-value="0.41" | 410 m || multiple || 2004–2019 || 28 Nov 2019 || 43 || align=left | — || 
|- id="2004 PL121" bgcolor=#fefefe
| 1 ||  || MBA-I || 18.9 || data-sort-value="0.49" | 490 m || multiple || 2004–2019 || 26 Nov 2019 || 37 || align=left | — || 
|- id="2004 PM121" bgcolor=#d6d6d6
| 1 ||  || MBA-O || 17.6 || 1.7 km || multiple || 2004–2019 || 25 Sep 2019 || 26 || align=left | — || 
|- id="2004 PN121" bgcolor=#fefefe
| 0 ||  || MBA-I || 18.4 || data-sort-value="0.62" | 620 m || multiple || 2004–2020 || 02 Feb 2020 || 66 || align=left | — || 
|- id="2004 PO121" bgcolor=#fefefe
| 0 ||  || MBA-I || 18.4 || data-sort-value="0.62" | 620 m || multiple || 2004–2020 || 22 Mar 2020 || 62 || align=left | — || 
|- id="2004 PP121" bgcolor=#fefefe
| 0 ||  || MBA-I || 17.96 || data-sort-value="0.76" | 760 m || multiple || 2004–2021 || 12 May 2021 || 71 || align=left | — || 
|- id="2004 PQ121" bgcolor=#E9E9E9
| 0 ||  || MBA-M || 17.6 || 1.3 km || multiple || 2004–2019 || 08 Jan 2019 || 29 || align=left | — || 
|- id="2004 PS121" bgcolor=#E9E9E9
| 0 ||  || MBA-M || 17.1 || 1.6 km || multiple || 2004–2021 || 12 Jun 2021 || 128 || align=left | Disc.: LONEOSAdded on 22 July 2020 || 
|- id="2004 PT121" bgcolor=#E9E9E9
| 0 ||  || MBA-M || 18.36 || data-sort-value="0.63" | 630 m || multiple || 2000–2021 || 26 Oct 2021 || 53 || align=left | Disc.: Pan-STARRSAdded on 22 July 2020 || 
|- id="2004 PU121" bgcolor=#d6d6d6
| 0 ||  || MBA-O || 17.5 || 1.8 km || multiple || 2004–2020 || 23 Oct 2020 || 34 || align=left | Disc.: Pan-STARRSAdded on 22 July 2020 || 
|- id="2004 PV121" bgcolor=#fefefe
| 0 ||  || MBA-I || 19.1 || data-sort-value="0.45" | 450 m || multiple || 2004–2019 || 28 Aug 2019 || 31 || align=left | Disc.: Pan-STARRSAdded on 22 July 2020 || 
|- id="2004 PW121" bgcolor=#d6d6d6
| 0 ||  || MBA-O || 17.2 || 2.0 km || multiple || 2004–2020 || 05 Nov 2020 || 58 || align=left | Disc.: MLSAdded on 19 October 2020 || 
|- id="2004 PY121" bgcolor=#fefefe
| 4 ||  || MBA-I || 19.5 || data-sort-value="0.37" | 370 m || multiple || 2004–2015 || 09 Oct 2015 || 24 || align=left | Disc.: SpacewatchAdded on 19 October 2020 || 
|- id="2004 PZ121" bgcolor=#d6d6d6
| 0 ||  || MBA-O || 18.2 || 1.3 km || multiple || 2003–2020 || 15 Oct 2020 || 42 || align=left | Disc.: Cerro TololoAdded on 17 January 2021 || 
|- id="2004 PB122" bgcolor=#E9E9E9
| 0 ||  || MBA-M || 18.4 || 1.2 km || multiple || 2003–2021 || 19 Apr 2021 || 31 || align=left | Disc.: Cerro TololoAdded on 17 June 2021 || 
|- id="2004 PC122" bgcolor=#d6d6d6
| 0 ||  || MBA-O || 17.40 || 1.8 km || multiple || 1999–2021 || 28 Oct 2021 || 46 || align=left | Disc.: CINEOSAdded on 17 June 2021 || 
|- id="2004 PD122" bgcolor=#E9E9E9
| 0 ||  || MBA-M || 17.8 || 1.5 km || multiple || 2004–2021 || 15 Apr 2021 || 36 || align=left | Disc.: Pan-STARRS 1Added on 17 June 2021 || 
|- id="2004 PE122" bgcolor=#E9E9E9
| 0 ||  || MBA-M || 18.21 || 1.3 km || multiple || 2004–2020 || 23 Jan 2020 || 36 || align=left | Disc.: Pan-STARRS 1Added on 21 August 2021 || 
|- id="2004 PF122" bgcolor=#d6d6d6
| 0 ||  || MBA-O || 17.0 || 2.2 km || multiple || 2004–2021 || 16 Aug 2021 || 50 || align=left | Disc.: MLSAdded on 21 August 2021 || 
|- id="2004 PG122" bgcolor=#E9E9E9
| 0 ||  || MBA-M || 18.16 || data-sort-value="0.98" | 980 m || multiple || 2004–2021 || 05 Oct 2021 || 66 || align=left | Disc.: Pan-STARRSAdded on 30 September 2021 || 
|- id="2004 PJ122" bgcolor=#d6d6d6
| 0 ||  || MBA-O || 17.77 || 1.6 km || multiple || 2004–2021 || 28 Sep 2021 || 49 || align=left | Disc.: SpacewatchAdded on 30 September 2021 || 
|- id="2004 PK122" bgcolor=#fefefe
| 0 ||  || MBA-I || 18.98 || data-sort-value="0.48" | 480 m || multiple || 2004–2021 || 15 Mar 2021 || 33 || align=left | Disc.: Pan-STARRSAdded on 5 November 2021 || 
|- id="2004 PL122" bgcolor=#E9E9E9
| 0 ||  || MBA-M || 17.85 || data-sort-value="0.80" | 800 m || multiple || 2004–2021 || 09 Dec 2021 || 70 || align=left | Disc.: Cerro TololoAdded on 5 November 2021 || 
|- id="2004 PM122" bgcolor=#d6d6d6
| 0 ||  || MBA-O || 17.17 || 2.0 km || multiple || 2004–2021 || 24 Nov 2021 || 70 || align=left | Disc.: Cerro TololoAdded on 5 November 2021 || 
|- id="2004 PN122" bgcolor=#d6d6d6
| 0 ||  || MBA-O || 17.64 || 1.7 km || multiple || 2004–2021 || 31 Oct 2021 || 41 || align=left | Disc.: Cerro TololoAdded on 5 November 2021 || 
|}
back to top

Q 

|- id="2004 QB" bgcolor=#FFC2E0
| 5 || 2004 QB || APO || 19.8 || data-sort-value="0.39" | 390 m || single || 30 days || 15 Sep 2004 || 72 || align=left | Potentially hazardous object || 
|- id="2004 QC" bgcolor=#d6d6d6
| 5 || 2004 QC || MBA-O || 16.7 || 2.5 km || multiple || 2004–2007 || 27 Jan 2007 || 19 || align=left | Alt.: 2007 BP37 || 
|- id="2004 QD" bgcolor=#E9E9E9
| 0 || 2004 QD || MBA-M || 17.63 || 1.7 km || multiple || 2004–2021 || 09 Apr 2021 || 64 || align=left | Alt.: 2014 WE5 || 
|- id="2004 QK" bgcolor=#d6d6d6
| 0 || 2004 QK || MBA-O || 16.43 || 2.9 km || multiple || 2004–2021 || 04 Dec 2021 || 163 || align=left | — || 
|- id="2004 QL" bgcolor=#E9E9E9
| 2 || 2004 QL || MBA-M || 17.7 || 1.6 km || multiple || 2004–2018 || 07 Sep 2018 || 39 || align=left | Alt.: 2010 BD7 || 
|- id="2004 QN" bgcolor=#E9E9E9
| – || 2004 QN || MBA-M || 19.0 || data-sort-value="0.67" | 670 m || single || 5 days || 22 Aug 2004 || 9 || align=left | — || 
|- id="2004 QP" bgcolor=#fefefe
| 5 || 2004 QP || MBA-I || 19.4 || data-sort-value="0.39" | 390 m || single || 82 days || 05 Nov 2004 || 43 || align=left | — || 
|- id="2004 QR" bgcolor=#FA8072
| – || 2004 QR || MCA || 18.7 || data-sort-value="0.54" | 540 m || single || 38 days || 23 Sep 2004 || 19 || align=left | — || 
|- id="2004 QD1" bgcolor=#FA8072
| 0 ||  || MCA || 17.26 || 1.5 km || multiple || 2004–2019 || 14 Jan 2019 || 110 || align=left | — || 
|- id="2004 QZ1" bgcolor=#FFC2E0
| 2 ||  || APO || 20.7 || data-sort-value="0.26" | 260 m || multiple || 2004–2020 || 27 Apr 2020 || 132 || align=left | — || 
|- id="2004 QA2" bgcolor=#FFC2E0
| 6 ||  || AMO || 22.3 || data-sort-value="0.12" | 120 m || single || 31 days || 20 Sep 2004 || 33 || align=left | — || 
|- id="2004 QB2" bgcolor=#FA8072
| 1 ||  || MCA || 17.64 || 1.7 km || multiple || 2004–2019 || 07 May 2019 || 96 || align=left | — || 
|- id="2004 QT2" bgcolor=#E9E9E9
| – ||  || MBA-M || 17.1 || 1.6 km || single || 12 days || 21 Aug 2004 || 11 || align=left | — || 
|- id="2004 QX2" bgcolor=#FFC2E0
| 8 ||  || APO || 21.7 || data-sort-value="0.16" | 160 m || single || 17 days || 06 Sep 2004 || 23 || align=left | Potentially hazardous object || 
|- id="2004 QA3" bgcolor=#FA8072
| – ||  || MCA || 18.6 || data-sort-value="0.57" | 570 m || single || 2 days || 22 Aug 2004 || 13 || align=left | — || 
|- id="2004 QB3" bgcolor=#FFC2E0
| 9 ||  || ATE || 24.4 || data-sort-value="0.047" | 47 m || single || 13 days || 03 Sep 2004 || 18 || align=left | — || 
|- id="2004 QC3" bgcolor=#FA8072
| 4 ||  || MCA || 19.9 || data-sort-value="0.31" | 310 m || single || 70 days || 23 Sep 2004 || 52 || align=left | — || 
|- id="2004 QD3" bgcolor=#FFC2E0
| 0 ||  || APO || 19.51 || data-sort-value="0.45" | 450 m || multiple || 2004–2021 || 13 Jan 2021 || 378 || align=left | — || 
|- id="2004 QR3" bgcolor=#fefefe
| 0 ||  || MBA-I || 18.55 || data-sort-value="0.58" | 580 m || multiple || 2004–2021 || 13 Apr 2021 || 63 || align=left | — || 
|- id="2004 QL4" bgcolor=#E9E9E9
| 0 ||  || MBA-M || 17.63 || data-sort-value="0.89" | 890 m || multiple || 2004–2022 || 06 Jan 2022 || 65 || align=left | — || 
|- id="2004 QR4" bgcolor=#FFC2E0
| 7 ||  || APO || 26.9 || data-sort-value="0.015" | 15 m || single || 3 days || 23 Aug 2004 || 15 || align=left | — || 
|- id="2004 QD5" bgcolor=#E9E9E9
| 0 ||  || MBA-M || 17.04 || 2.2 km || multiple || 2004–2021 || 03 May 2021 || 105 || align=left | — || 
|- id="2004 QL5" bgcolor=#E9E9E9
| 2 ||  || MBA-M || 17.5 || 1.8 km || multiple || 2004–2018 || 10 Dec 2018 || 52 || align=left | — || 
|- id="2004 QN5" bgcolor=#FFC2E0
| 5 ||  || AMO || 21.3 || data-sort-value="0.20" | 200 m || single || 47 days || 08 Oct 2004 || 50 || align=left | — || 
|- id="2004 QO5" bgcolor=#FFC2E0
| 8 ||  || APO || 25.9 || data-sort-value="0.023" | 23 m || single || 5 days || 25 Aug 2004 || 9 || align=left | — || 
|- id="2004 QV5" bgcolor=#d6d6d6
| 0 ||  || MBA-O || 17.39 || 1.9 km || multiple || 2004–2021 || 08 Nov 2021 || 60 || align=left | Disc.: SpacewatchAdded on 5 November 2021 || 
|- id="2004 QX5" bgcolor=#d6d6d6
| 0 ||  || MBA-O || 17.69 || 1.6 km || multiple || 2004–2022 || 25 Jan 2022 || 40 || align=left | Disc.: SpacewatchAdded on 17 January 2021 || 
|- id="2004 QC6" bgcolor=#d6d6d6
| 0 ||  || MBA-O || 17.19 || 2.0 km || multiple || 2004–2021 || 01 Dec 2021 || 79 || align=left | — || 
|- id="2004 QD6" bgcolor=#E9E9E9
| 0 ||  || MBA-M || 18.32 || data-sort-value="0.64" | 640 m || multiple || 2004–2021 || 01 Nov 2021 || 41 || align=left | Disc.: SpacewatchAdded on 19 October 2020 || 
|- id="2004 QF6" bgcolor=#d6d6d6
| 0 ||  || MBA-O || 16.12 || 3.3 km || multiple || 1993–2021 || 08 Sep 2021 || 181 || align=left | Alt.: 2007 DQ48, 2010 RP54, 2010 VU35 || 
|- id="2004 QR6" bgcolor=#E9E9E9
| – ||  || MBA-M || 17.5 || data-sort-value="0.94" | 940 m || single || 18 days || 09 Sep 2004 || 26 || align=left | — || 
|- id="2004 QM7" bgcolor=#E9E9E9
| 0 ||  || MBA-M || 17.52 || data-sort-value="0.93" | 930 m || multiple || 2004–2021 || 04 Dec 2021 || 126 || align=left | — || 
|- id="2004 QX7" bgcolor=#E9E9E9
| 1 ||  || MBA-M || 17.6 || 1.3 km || multiple || 2000–2017 || 07 Nov 2017 || 40 || align=left | Alt.: 2017 OK79 || 
|- id="2004 QY7" bgcolor=#E9E9E9
| 0 ||  || MBA-M || 17.05 || 1.6 km || multiple || 2004–2021 || 08 Aug 2021 || 88 || align=left | Alt.: 2013 TX111 || 
|- id="2004 QK8" bgcolor=#E9E9E9
| 0 ||  || MBA-M || 16.61 || 1.4 km || multiple || 1992–2022 || 25 Jan 2022 || 186 || align=left | Alt.: 1992 RF1, 2014 BU61 || 
|- id="2004 QS8" bgcolor=#d6d6d6
| 0 ||  || MBA-O || 15.9 || 3.7 km || multiple || 2003–2021 || 03 Oct 2021 || 162 || align=left | Alt.: 2010 MS137 || 
|- id="2004 QC10" bgcolor=#E9E9E9
| 0 ||  || MBA-M || 16.5 || 2.8 km || multiple || 2003–2021 || 12 Jan 2021 || 112 || align=left | Alt.: 2012 CO56 || 
|- id="2004 QT10" bgcolor=#E9E9E9
| 0 ||  || MBA-M || 16.9 || 1.8 km || multiple || 2000–2017 || 10 Oct 2017 || 60 || align=left | Alt.: 2017 ON21 || 
|- id="2004 QE11" bgcolor=#d6d6d6
| 0 ||  || MBA-O || 16.6 || 2.7 km || multiple || 2004–2020 || 10 Dec 2020 || 142 || align=left | — || 
|- id="2004 QE13" bgcolor=#fefefe
| 0 ||  || MBA-I || 18.35 || data-sort-value="0.64" | 640 m || multiple || 2004–2021 || 01 Nov 2021 || 94 || align=left | Disc.: SSSAdded on 30 September 2021Alt.: 2011 SP335 || 
|- id="2004 QG13" bgcolor=#FFC2E0
| 9 ||  || ATE || 21.4 || data-sort-value="0.19" | 190 m || single || 6 days || 30 Aug 2004 || 47 || align=left | — || 
|- id="2004 QJ13" bgcolor=#FFC2E0
| 7 ||  || AMO || 25.3 || data-sort-value="0.031" | 31 m || single || 2 days || 25 Aug 2004 || 18 || align=left | — || 
|- id="2004 QR13" bgcolor=#fefefe
| 1 ||  || MBA-I || 18.1 || data-sort-value="0.71" | 710 m || multiple || 2004–2015 || 01 Dec 2015 || 30 || align=left | — || 
|- id="2004 QW13" bgcolor=#fefefe
| 1 ||  || MBA-I || 17.2 || 1.1 km || multiple || 2001–2021 || 15 Jan 2021 || 76 || align=left | Alt.: 2015 PD62 || 
|- id="2004 QB14" bgcolor=#fefefe
| 1 ||  || MBA-I || 16.8 || 1.3 km || multiple || 2004–2020 || 14 Feb 2020 || 132 || align=left | — || 
|- id="2004 QF14" bgcolor=#FFC2E0
| 6 ||  || APO || 22.9 || data-sort-value="0.093" | 93 m || single || 41 days || 05 Oct 2004 || 82 || align=left | — || 
|- id="2004 QZ14" bgcolor=#fefefe
| 2 ||  || MBA-I || 19.0 || data-sort-value="0.47" | 470 m || multiple || 2004–2018 || 09 Nov 2018 || 39 || align=left | — || 
|- id="2004 QB15" bgcolor=#d6d6d6
| 0 ||  || MBA-O || 17.61 || 1.7 km || multiple || 2004–2020 || 05 Nov 2020 || 45 || align=left | Alt.: 2007 FG35 || 
|- id="2004 QJ15" bgcolor=#E9E9E9
| 0 ||  || MBA-M || 16.64 || 2.6 km || multiple || 2002–2021 || 09 May 2021 || 105 || align=left | Alt.: 2016 EO41 || 
|- id="2004 QM15" bgcolor=#fefefe
| 0 ||  || MBA-I || 19.12 || data-sort-value="0.45" | 450 m || multiple || 1994–2021 || 30 Nov 2021 || 65 || align=left | —Added on 22 July 2020 || 
|- id="2004 QA16" bgcolor=#d6d6d6
| 1 ||  || MBA-O || 18.1 || 1.3 km || multiple || 2004–2020 || 23 Aug 2020 || 23 || align=left | Disc.: Mauna Kea Obs.Added on 19 October 2020 || 
|- id="2004 QE16" bgcolor=#fefefe
| 1 ||  || MBA-I || 19.73 || data-sort-value="0.34" | 340 m || multiple || 2004–2021 || 01 May 2021 || 48 || align=left | —Added on 22 July 2020Alt.: 2014 HT59 || 
|- id="2004 QF16" bgcolor=#d6d6d6
| 0 ||  || MBA-O || 16.57 || 2.7 km || multiple || 2003–2021 || 30 Nov 2021 || 159 || align=left | Alt.: 2005 WW99, 2019 JN17 || 
|- id="2004 QP16" bgcolor=#fefefe
| 3 ||  || MBA-I || 20.0 || data-sort-value="0.30" | 300 m || multiple || 2004–2019 || 23 Oct 2019 || 25 || align=left | — || 
|- id="2004 QA17" bgcolor=#FA8072
| 0 ||  || MCA || 18.9 || data-sort-value="0.49" | 490 m || multiple || 2004–2020 || 14 Nov 2020 || 62 || align=left | Alt.: 2020 LT4 || 
|- id="2004 QC17" bgcolor=#FFC2E0
| 1 ||  || AMO || 18.7 || data-sort-value="0.65" | 650 m || multiple || 2002–2021 || 14 Jan 2021 || 349 || align=left | — || 
|- id="2004 QD17" bgcolor=#FFC2E0
| 0 ||  || AMO || 19.85 || data-sort-value="0.38" | 380 m || multiple || 2004–2021 || 12 Jan 2021 || 388 || align=left | — || 
|- id="2004 QK17" bgcolor=#fefefe
| 0 ||  || MBA-I || 17.75 || data-sort-value="0.84" | 840 m || multiple || 2004–2021 || 08 Nov 2021 || 78 || align=left | — || 
|- id="2004 QF20" bgcolor=#FA8072
| 1 ||  || MCA || 17.4 || data-sort-value="0.98" | 980 m || multiple || 2004–2021 || 15 Jan 2021 || 137 || align=left | — || 
|- id="2004 QG20" bgcolor=#FFC2E0
| 1 ||  || AMO || 19.2 || data-sort-value="0.51" | 510 m || multiple || 1986–2016 || 09 Jan 2016 || 129 || align=left | — || 
|- id="2004 QN20" bgcolor=#d6d6d6
| 0 ||  || MBA-O || 17.26 || 2.0 km || multiple || 2004–2022 || 22 Jan 2022 || 86 || align=left | — || 
|- id="2004 QP20" bgcolor=#E9E9E9
| 0 ||  || MBA-M || 16.8 || 2.4 km || multiple || 2004–2021 || 15 Jan 2021 || 128 || align=left | Alt.: 2017 GU2 || 
|- id="2004 QT20" bgcolor=#E9E9E9
| 0 ||  || MBA-M || 17.43 || 1.4 km || multiple || 2004–2021 || 11 Jul 2021 || 83 || align=left | Alt.: 2017 TS12 || 
|- id="2004 QU20" bgcolor=#fefefe
| 0 ||  || MBA-I || 17.27 || 1.0 km || multiple || 1996–2021 || 01 May 2021 || 153 || align=left | Alt.: 2010 FJ123, 2018 NO || 
|- id="2004 QA22" bgcolor=#FFC2E0
| 6 ||  || ATE || 27.9 || data-sort-value="0.0093" | 9 m || single || 10 days || 04 Sep 2004 || 44 || align=left | — || 
|- id="2004 QN22" bgcolor=#FFC2E0
| 6 ||  || APO || 24.2 || data-sort-value="0.051" | 51 m || single || 8 days || 02 Sep 2004 || 29 || align=left | AMO at MPC || 
|- id="2004 QW22" bgcolor=#d6d6d6
| 0 ||  || MBA-O || 18.01 || 1.4 km || multiple || 1999–2022 || 07 Jan 2022 || 35 || align=left | Alt.: 2020 RM30 || 
|- id="2004 QX22" bgcolor=#d6d6d6
| E ||  || MBA-O || 16.8 || 2.4 km || single || 3 days || 23 Aug 2004 || 9 || align=left | — || 
|- id="2004 QA23" bgcolor=#E9E9E9
| 1 ||  || MBA-M || 17.8 || data-sort-value="0.82" | 820 m || multiple || 2000–2020 || 16 Sep 2020 || 76 || align=left | — || 
|- id="2004 QK23" bgcolor=#fefefe
| 2 ||  || MBA-I || 19.24 || data-sort-value="0.42" | 420 m || multiple || 2004–2021 || 08 Apr 2021 || 36 || align=left | — || 
|- id="2004 QW23" bgcolor=#E9E9E9
| 2 ||  || MBA-M || 18.0 || 1.4 km || multiple || 2004–2017 || 03 May 2017 || 25 || align=left | — || 
|- id="2004 QW25" bgcolor=#E9E9E9
| 0 ||  || MBA-M || 17.81 || 1.2 km || multiple || 2004–2021 || 31 Oct 2021 || 134 || align=left | — || 
|- id="2004 QY25" bgcolor=#d6d6d6
| 2 ||  || MBA-O || 16.9 || 2.3 km || multiple || 2004–2020 || 18 Jan 2020 || 89 || align=left | — || 
|- id="2004 QQ26" bgcolor=#C7FF8F
| 0 ||  || CEN || 9.6 || 79 km || multiple || 2004–2014 || 22 Aug 2014 || 55 || align=left | , albedo: 0.044 || 
|- id="2004 QO27" bgcolor=#fefefe
| 0 ||  || MBA-I || 19.3 || data-sort-value="0.41" | 410 m || multiple || 2004–2020 || 14 Sep 2020 || 70 || align=left | — || 
|- id="2004 QB28" bgcolor=#E9E9E9
| 0 ||  || MBA-M || 18.61 || data-sort-value="0.80" | 800 m || multiple || 2004–2021 || 01 Nov 2021 || 44 || align=left | — || 
|- id="2004 QK28" bgcolor=#d6d6d6
| 0 ||  || MBA-O || 16.59 || 2.7 km || multiple || 2004–2021 || 03 Oct 2021 || 68 || align=left | Alt.: 2010 NJ124 || 
|- id="2004 QL28" bgcolor=#d6d6d6
| 0 ||  || MBA-O || 16.73 || 2.5 km || multiple || 2004–2021 || 01 Nov 2021 || 55 || align=left | — || 
|- id="2004 QN28" bgcolor=#E9E9E9
| 0 ||  || MBA-M || 18.38 || data-sort-value="0.89" | 890 m || multiple || 2004–2021 || 10 Aug 2021 || 28 || align=left | — || 
|- id="2004 QP28" bgcolor=#fefefe
| 3 ||  || MBA-I || 18.5 || data-sort-value="0.59" | 590 m || multiple || 2004–2015 || 14 Nov 2015 || 36 || align=left | Alt.: 2011 PW4 || 
|- id="2004 QE29" bgcolor=#C2E0FF
| 3 ||  || TNO || 7.46 || 134 km || multiple || 2004–2018 || 26 Nov 2018 || 31 || align=left | LoUTNOs, other TNO || 
|- id="2004 QG29" bgcolor=#C2E0FF
| 2 ||  || TNO || 7.9 || 109 km || multiple || 2004–2014 || 22 Oct 2014 || 14 || align=left | LoUTNOs, other TNO || 
|- id="2004 QH29" bgcolor=#C2E0FF
| 3 ||  || TNO || 7.3 || 144 km || multiple || 2004–2014 || 22 Oct 2014 || 24 || align=left | LoUTNOs, other TNO || 
|- id="2004 QM29" bgcolor=#FA8072
| 1 ||  || MCA || 18.5 || data-sort-value="0.59" | 590 m || multiple || 2004–2020 || 22 May 2020 || 52 || align=left | — || 
|- id="2004 QN29" bgcolor=#fefefe
| 0 ||  || MBA-I || 18.1 || data-sort-value="0.71" | 710 m || multiple || 1996–2019 || 05 Nov 2019 || 55 || align=left | — || 
|- id="2004 QU29" bgcolor=#E9E9E9
| 0 ||  || MBA-M || 17.50 || 1.8 km || multiple || 2004–2021 || 11 May 2021 || 89 || align=left | — || 
|- id="2004 QZ29" bgcolor=#d6d6d6
| 0 ||  || MBA-O || 16.8 || 2.4 km || multiple || 2004–2021 || 06 Jan 2021 || 104 || align=left | — || 
|- id="2004 QE30" bgcolor=#E9E9E9
| 0 ||  || MBA-M || 16.94 || 2.3 km || multiple || 2004–2021 || 18 Apr 2021 || 160 || align=left | Alt.: 2016 AJ160 || 
|- id="2004 QF30" bgcolor=#E9E9E9
| 0 ||  || MBA-M || 17.0 || 2.2 km || multiple || 2004–2020 || 15 Feb 2020 || 91 || align=left | — || 
|- id="2004 QH30" bgcolor=#E9E9E9
| 0 ||  || MBA-M || 17.3 || 1.9 km || multiple || 2004–2018 || 06 Oct 2018 || 66 || align=left | Alt.: 2009 SY372 || 
|- id="2004 QK30" bgcolor=#d6d6d6
| 0 ||  || MBA-O || 16.84 || 2.4 km || multiple || 2004–2021 || 26 Nov 2021 || 120 || align=left | — || 
|- id="2004 QR30" bgcolor=#E9E9E9
| 0 ||  || MBA-M || 17.92 || 1.1 km || multiple || 2004–2021 || 27 Oct 2021 || 124 || align=left | — || 
|- id="2004 QS30" bgcolor=#fefefe
| 0 ||  || MBA-I || 18.48 || data-sort-value="0.60" | 600 m || multiple || 2004–2021 || 13 May 2021 || 84 || align=left | Alt.: 2010 HK130 || 
|- id="2004 QT30" bgcolor=#E9E9E9
| 0 ||  || MBA-M || 17.77 || data-sort-value="0.83" | 830 m || multiple || 2004–2021 || 07 Nov 2021 || 132 || align=left | — || 
|- id="2004 QU30" bgcolor=#fefefe
| 0 ||  || MBA-I || 18.78 || data-sort-value="0.52" | 520 m || multiple || 2004–2021 || 05 Jul 2021 || 79 || align=left | — || 
|- id="2004 QV30" bgcolor=#fefefe
| 0 ||  || MBA-I || 18.4 || data-sort-value="0.62" | 620 m || multiple || 2004–2020 || 02 Feb 2020 || 74 || align=left | — || 
|- id="2004 QZ30" bgcolor=#d6d6d6
| 0 ||  || MBA-O || 16.99 || 2.2 km || multiple || 2004–2021 || 29 Oct 2021 || 99 || align=left | — || 
|- id="2004 QA31" bgcolor=#fefefe
| 0 ||  || MBA-I || 18.23 || data-sort-value="0.67" | 670 m || multiple || 2004–2021 || 11 Jun 2021 || 75 || align=left | — || 
|- id="2004 QE31" bgcolor=#E9E9E9
| 0 ||  || MBA-M || 17.65 || data-sort-value="0.88" | 880 m || multiple || 2004–2021 || 27 Nov 2021 || 142 || align=left | — || 
|- id="2004 QF31" bgcolor=#E9E9E9
| 0 ||  || MBA-M || 18.26 || data-sort-value="0.66" | 660 m || multiple || 2004–2022 || 25 Jan 2022 || 65 || align=left | — || 
|- id="2004 QG31" bgcolor=#E9E9E9
| 0 ||  || MBA-M || 17.6 || 1.7 km || multiple || 2004–2018 || 13 Aug 2018 || 42 || align=left | — || 
|- id="2004 QH31" bgcolor=#fefefe
| 0 ||  || MBA-I || 18.2 || data-sort-value="0.68" | 680 m || multiple || 2004–2020 || 26 Jan 2020 || 49 || align=left | — || 
|- id="2004 QJ31" bgcolor=#fefefe
| 0 ||  || MBA-I || 18.07 || data-sort-value="0.72" | 720 m || multiple || 2004–2021 || 09 May 2021 || 68 || align=left | — || 
|- id="2004 QL31" bgcolor=#d6d6d6
| 0 ||  || MBA-O || 16.64 || 2.6 km || multiple || 2004–2021 || 02 Dec 2021 || 119 || align=left | — || 
|- id="2004 QM31" bgcolor=#d6d6d6
| 0 ||  || MBA-O || 16.21 || 3.2 km || multiple || 2004–2021 || 25 Nov 2021 || 105 || align=left | Alt.: 2010 OD25 || 
|- id="2004 QO31" bgcolor=#E9E9E9
| 0 ||  || MBA-M || 18.09 || 1.0 km || multiple || 2004–2021 || 04 Oct 2021 || 74 || align=left | — || 
|- id="2004 QP31" bgcolor=#E9E9E9
| 0 ||  || MBA-M || 18.3 || 1.2 km || multiple || 2004–2017 || 27 May 2017 || 40 || align=left | — || 
|- id="2004 QQ31" bgcolor=#d6d6d6
| 0 ||  || MBA-O || 16.72 || 2.5 km || multiple || 2004–2021 || 02 Dec 2021 || 103 || align=left | — || 
|- id="2004 QR31" bgcolor=#fefefe
| 1 ||  || MBA-I || 18.4 || data-sort-value="0.62" | 620 m || multiple || 2004–2020 || 29 Jun 2020 || 52 || align=left | Alt.: 2017 SL132 || 
|- id="2004 QS31" bgcolor=#E9E9E9
| 0 ||  || MBA-M || 17.78 || data-sort-value="0.83" | 830 m || multiple || 2004–2021 || 26 Nov 2021 || 82 || align=left | — || 
|- id="2004 QU31" bgcolor=#E9E9E9
| 0 ||  || MBA-M || 17.5 || 1.3 km || multiple || 2004–2020 || 26 Jan 2020 || 45 || align=left | — || 
|- id="2004 QY31" bgcolor=#d6d6d6
| 0 ||  || MBA-O || 17.04 || 2.2 km || multiple || 2004–2021 || 08 Sep 2021 || 44 || align=left | — || 
|- id="2004 QZ31" bgcolor=#E9E9E9
| 0 ||  || MBA-M || 18.17 || data-sort-value="0.98" | 980 m || multiple || 2004–2021 || 05 Oct 2021 || 71 || align=left | — || 
|- id="2004 QA32" bgcolor=#E9E9E9
| 1 ||  || MBA-M || 18.09 || data-sort-value="0.72" | 720 m || multiple || 2004–2021 || 25 Nov 2021 || 96 || align=left | — || 
|- id="2004 QD32" bgcolor=#d6d6d6
| 0 ||  || MBA-O || 17.3 || 1.9 km || multiple || 2004–2020 || 07 Oct 2020 || 68 || align=left | — || 
|- id="2004 QE32" bgcolor=#fefefe
| 3 ||  || MBA-I || 18.1 || data-sort-value="0.71" | 710 m || multiple || 2004–2020 || 16 Nov 2020 || 50 || align=left | — || 
|- id="2004 QF32" bgcolor=#fefefe
| 0 ||  || MBA-I || 18.8 || data-sort-value="0.52" | 520 m || multiple || 2004–2020 || 23 Jun 2020 || 55 || align=left | — || 
|- id="2004 QG32" bgcolor=#fefefe
| 0 ||  || MBA-I || 18.1 || data-sort-value="0.71" | 710 m || multiple || 2004–2019 || 20 Dec 2019 || 59 || align=left | — || 
|- id="2004 QH32" bgcolor=#E9E9E9
| 0 ||  || MBA-M || 17.61 || 1.3 km || multiple || 2004–2021 || 22 May 2021 || 36 || align=left | — || 
|- id="2004 QJ32" bgcolor=#E9E9E9
| 0 ||  || MBA-M || 17.49 || 1.8 km || multiple || 2004–2021 || 31 May 2021 || 63 || align=left | — || 
|- id="2004 QK32" bgcolor=#fefefe
| 0 ||  || MBA-I || 18.57 || data-sort-value="0.57" | 570 m || multiple || 2004–2021 || 11 May 2021 || 170 || align=left | — || 
|- id="2004 QM32" bgcolor=#E9E9E9
| 1 ||  || MBA-M || 18.8 || data-sort-value="0.52" | 520 m || multiple || 2000–2020 || 15 Oct 2020 || 56 || align=left | — || 
|- id="2004 QN32" bgcolor=#FA8072
| 0 ||  || MCA || 19.3 || data-sort-value="0.41" | 410 m || multiple || 2004–2020 || 15 Sep 2020 || 60 || align=left | — || 
|- id="2004 QP32" bgcolor=#E9E9E9
| 0 ||  || MBA-M || 18.2 || data-sort-value="0.96" | 960 m || multiple || 2004–2019 || 26 Feb 2019 || 40 || align=left | — || 
|- id="2004 QQ32" bgcolor=#E9E9E9
| 0 ||  || MBA-M || 18.55 || data-sort-value="0.82" | 820 m || multiple || 2004–2021 || 04 Dec 2021 || 94 || align=left | — || 
|- id="2004 QR32" bgcolor=#fefefe
| 1 ||  || MBA-I || 17.0 || 1.2 km || multiple || 2004–2020 || 29 Apr 2020 || 79 || align=left | — || 
|- id="2004 QS32" bgcolor=#d6d6d6
| 1 ||  || MBA-O || 17.59 || 1.7 km || multiple || 2004–2021 || 11 Nov 2021 || 41 || align=left | — || 
|- id="2004 QT32" bgcolor=#E9E9E9
| 2 ||  || MBA-M || 18.0 || 1.1 km || multiple || 2004–2017 || 23 Oct 2017 || 27 || align=left | — || 
|- id="2004 QU32" bgcolor=#fefefe
| 0 ||  || MBA-I || 18.92 || data-sort-value="0.49" | 490 m || multiple || 2004–2021 || 16 May 2021 || 130 || align=left | — || 
|- id="2004 QV32" bgcolor=#fefefe
| 0 ||  || MBA-I || 19.28 || data-sort-value="0.41" | 410 m || multiple || 2004–2021 || 29 Nov 2021 || 40 || align=left | — || 
|- id="2004 QW32" bgcolor=#E9E9E9
| 0 ||  || MBA-M || 17.60 || data-sort-value="0.90" | 900 m || multiple || 2004–2021 || 04 Nov 2021 || 44 || align=left | — || 
|- id="2004 QX32" bgcolor=#E9E9E9
| 3 ||  || MBA-M || 18.4 || data-sort-value="0.88" | 880 m || multiple || 2004–2017 || 23 Sep 2017 || 15 || align=left | — || 
|- id="2004 QY32" bgcolor=#fefefe
| 0 ||  || MBA-I || 18.9 || data-sort-value="0.49" | 490 m || multiple || 2004–2019 || 28 Nov 2019 || 61 || align=left | Alt.: 2019 SS13 || 
|- id="2004 QZ32" bgcolor=#E9E9E9
| 0 ||  || MBA-M || 17.62 || 1.3 km || multiple || 2004–2021 || 24 Oct 2021 || 95 || align=left | — || 
|- id="2004 QA33" bgcolor=#d6d6d6
| 0 ||  || MBA-O || 16.00 || 3.5 km || multiple || 2004–2021 || 08 Dec 2021 || 248 || align=left | — || 
|- id="2004 QB33" bgcolor=#fefefe
| 0 ||  || MBA-I || 18.0 || data-sort-value="0.75" | 750 m || multiple || 2004–2019 || 25 Sep 2019 || 90 || align=left | — || 
|- id="2004 QC33" bgcolor=#fefefe
| 0 ||  || MBA-I || 18.2 || data-sort-value="0.68" | 680 m || multiple || 2004–2019 || 20 Aug 2019 || 75 || align=left | — || 
|- id="2004 QE33" bgcolor=#fefefe
| 0 ||  || MBA-I || 17.8 || data-sort-value="0.82" | 820 m || multiple || 2004–2020 || 12 Apr 2020 || 89 || align=left | — || 
|- id="2004 QJ33" bgcolor=#fefefe
| 0 ||  || MBA-I || 18.2 || data-sort-value="0.68" | 680 m || multiple || 2000–2021 || 08 Jun 2021 || 87 || align=left | — || 
|- id="2004 QK33" bgcolor=#fefefe
| 1 ||  || MBA-I || 18.0 || data-sort-value="0.75" | 750 m || multiple || 1993–2019 || 29 Oct 2019 || 64 || align=left | — || 
|- id="2004 QL33" bgcolor=#fefefe
| 0 ||  || MBA-I || 18.08 || data-sort-value="0.72" | 720 m || multiple || 2004–2021 || 15 Apr 2021 || 74 || align=left | — || 
|- id="2004 QO33" bgcolor=#fefefe
| 0 ||  || MBA-I || 18.47 || data-sort-value="0.60" | 600 m || multiple || 2002–2022 || 12 Jan 2022 || 80 || align=left | — || 
|- id="2004 QP33" bgcolor=#fefefe
| 0 ||  || MBA-I || 18.0 || data-sort-value="0.75" | 750 m || multiple || 2004–2019 || 25 Sep 2019 || 53 || align=left | — || 
|- id="2004 QQ33" bgcolor=#E9E9E9
| 0 ||  || MBA-M || 17.7 || 1.6 km || multiple || 2004–2018 || 12 Oct 2018 || 56 || align=left | — || 
|- id="2004 QR33" bgcolor=#d6d6d6
| 1 ||  || MBA-O || 16.8 || 2.4 km || multiple || 2004–2019 || 28 Oct 2019 || 53 || align=left | — || 
|- id="2004 QS33" bgcolor=#E9E9E9
| 0 ||  || MBA-M || 17.3 || 1.5 km || multiple || 2004–2021 || 05 Jun 2021 || 68 || align=left | — || 
|- id="2004 QT33" bgcolor=#E9E9E9
| 0 ||  || MBA-M || 17.63 || 1.7 km || multiple || 2004–2021 || 12 May 2021 || 79 || align=left | — || 
|- id="2004 QU33" bgcolor=#E9E9E9
| 0 ||  || MBA-M || 17.48 || 1.3 km || multiple || 2004–2021 || 27 Nov 2021 || 135 || align=left | — || 
|- id="2004 QV33" bgcolor=#d6d6d6
| 0 ||  || MBA-O || 16.87 || 2.4 km || multiple || 2004–2021 || 29 Nov 2021 || 115 || align=left | — || 
|- id="2004 QX33" bgcolor=#fefefe
| 0 ||  || MBA-I || 18.0 || data-sort-value="0.75" | 750 m || multiple || 2004–2021 || 17 Jan 2021 || 57 || align=left | — || 
|- id="2004 QY33" bgcolor=#d6d6d6
| 1 ||  || MBA-O || 17.2 || 2.0 km || multiple || 2004–2020 || 12 Dec 2020 || 54 || align=left | — || 
|- id="2004 QZ33" bgcolor=#fefefe
| 0 ||  || MBA-I || 18.0 || data-sort-value="0.75" | 750 m || multiple || 2004–2021 || 11 Jun 2021 || 65 || align=left | — || 
|- id="2004 QA34" bgcolor=#fefefe
| 0 ||  || MBA-I || 18.23 || data-sort-value="0.67" | 670 m || multiple || 2004–2021 || 12 May 2021 || 78 || align=left | — || 
|- id="2004 QB34" bgcolor=#fefefe
| 0 ||  || MBA-I || 18.46 || data-sort-value="0.60" | 600 m || multiple || 2004–2021 || 15 Apr 2021 || 62 || align=left | — || 
|- id="2004 QC34" bgcolor=#fefefe
| 0 ||  || MBA-I || 18.7 || data-sort-value="0.54" | 540 m || multiple || 2004–2019 || 08 Feb 2019 || 38 || align=left | — || 
|- id="2004 QD34" bgcolor=#E9E9E9
| 0 ||  || MBA-M || 17.9 || 1.1 km || multiple || 2004–2020 || 29 Feb 2020 || 48 || align=left | — || 
|- id="2004 QE34" bgcolor=#d6d6d6
| 2 ||  || MBA-O || 17.6 || 1.7 km || multiple || 2004–2019 || 08 Nov 2019 || 43 || align=left | — || 
|- id="2004 QF34" bgcolor=#E9E9E9
| 0 ||  || MBA-M || 17.0 || 2.2 km || multiple || 2004–2018 || 13 Aug 2018 || 41 || align=left | — || 
|- id="2004 QG34" bgcolor=#fefefe
| 0 ||  || MBA-I || 18.34 || data-sort-value="0.64" | 640 m || multiple || 2004–2021 || 04 May 2021 || 58 || align=left | — || 
|- id="2004 QH34" bgcolor=#E9E9E9
| 0 ||  || MBA-M || 17.61 || 1.7 km || multiple || 2004–2021 || 07 Apr 2021 || 74 || align=left | — || 
|- id="2004 QJ34" bgcolor=#fefefe
| 0 ||  || MBA-I || 18.25 || data-sort-value="0.67" | 670 m || multiple || 2004–2021 || 11 Jun 2021 || 82 || align=left | — || 
|- id="2004 QK34" bgcolor=#d6d6d6
| 0 ||  || MBA-O || 17.5 || 1.8 km || multiple || 2004–2019 || 02 Nov 2019 || 39 || align=left | — || 
|- id="2004 QL34" bgcolor=#fefefe
| 1 ||  || MBA-I || 18.7 || data-sort-value="0.54" | 540 m || multiple || 2004–2019 || 21 Oct 2019 || 45 || align=left | — || 
|- id="2004 QM34" bgcolor=#fefefe
| 0 ||  || MBA-I || 19.46 || data-sort-value="0.38" | 380 m || multiple || 2004–2021 || 05 Jul 2021 || 43 || align=left | — || 
|- id="2004 QN34" bgcolor=#E9E9E9
| 0 ||  || MBA-M || 17.79 || 1.2 km || multiple || 2004–2021 || 09 Oct 2021 || 61 || align=left | — || 
|- id="2004 QO34" bgcolor=#fefefe
| 1 ||  || MBA-I || 18.7 || data-sort-value="0.54" | 540 m || multiple || 2004–2017 || 21 Sep 2017 || 36 || align=left | — || 
|- id="2004 QP34" bgcolor=#E9E9E9
| 0 ||  || MBA-M || 17.9 || 1.5 km || multiple || 2004–2020 || 23 Jan 2020 || 41 || align=left | — || 
|- id="2004 QR34" bgcolor=#E9E9E9
| 1 ||  || MBA-M || 18.1 || 1.3 km || multiple || 2004–2018 || 04 Dec 2018 || 36 || align=left | — || 
|- id="2004 QS34" bgcolor=#E9E9E9
| 0 ||  || MBA-M || 17.46 || 1.8 km || multiple || 2004–2021 || 10 Apr 2021 || 68 || align=left | — || 
|- id="2004 QT34" bgcolor=#fefefe
| 0 ||  || MBA-I || 18.91 || data-sort-value="0.49" | 490 m || multiple || 2004–2021 || 13 Jun 2021 || 50 || align=left | — || 
|- id="2004 QU34" bgcolor=#fefefe
| 1 ||  || MBA-I || 18.4 || data-sort-value="0.62" | 620 m || multiple || 2004–2019 || 01 Nov 2019 || 41 || align=left | — || 
|- id="2004 QV34" bgcolor=#E9E9E9
| 0 ||  || MBA-M || 16.9 || 2.3 km || multiple || 2004–2018 || 01 Nov 2018 || 37 || align=left | — || 
|- id="2004 QW34" bgcolor=#E9E9E9
| 0 ||  || MBA-M || 17.79 || 1.5 km || multiple || 2004–2021 || 08 May 2021 || 48 || align=left | — || 
|- id="2004 QX34" bgcolor=#fefefe
| 0 ||  || MBA-I || 19.2 || data-sort-value="0.43" | 430 m || multiple || 2004–2020 || 07 Oct 2020 || 55 || align=left | — || 
|- id="2004 QY34" bgcolor=#E9E9E9
| 0 ||  || MBA-M || 17.45 || 1.4 km || multiple || 2004–2021 || 27 Nov 2021 || 138 || align=left | — || 
|- id="2004 QZ34" bgcolor=#d6d6d6
| 0 ||  || MBA-O || 15.5 || 4.4 km || multiple || 2003–2020 || 26 May 2020 || 77 || align=left | — || 
|- id="2004 QA35" bgcolor=#fefefe
| 1 ||  || MBA-I || 17.6 || data-sort-value="0.90" | 900 m || multiple || 2004–2020 || 11 Apr 2020 || 55 || align=left | — || 
|- id="2004 QB35" bgcolor=#fefefe
| 0 ||  || HUN || 19.11 || data-sort-value="0.45" | 450 m || multiple || 2004–2021 || 31 Aug 2021 || 67 || align=left | — || 
|- id="2004 QC35" bgcolor=#E9E9E9
| 0 ||  || MBA-M || 17.39 || 1.4 km || multiple || 2004–2021 || 08 Nov 2021 || 108 || align=left | — || 
|- id="2004 QD35" bgcolor=#fefefe
| 0 ||  || MBA-I || 18.48 || data-sort-value="0.60" | 600 m || multiple || 2004–2021 || 01 May 2021 || 48 || align=left | — || 
|- id="2004 QE35" bgcolor=#E9E9E9
| 0 ||  || MBA-M || 18.00 || 1.1 km || multiple || 2004–2021 || 30 Jul 2021 || 74 || align=left | — || 
|- id="2004 QF35" bgcolor=#E9E9E9
| 4 ||  || MBA-M || 18.6 || 1.1 km || multiple || 2004–2018 || 06 Oct 2018 || 19 || align=left | — || 
|- id="2004 QG35" bgcolor=#E9E9E9
| 1 ||  || MBA-M || 18.4 || 1.2 km || multiple || 2004–2018 || 05 Nov 2018 || 20 || align=left | — || 
|- id="2004 QH35" bgcolor=#fefefe
| 0 ||  || MBA-I || 17.7 || data-sort-value="0.86" | 860 m || multiple || 2004–2020 || 07 Dec 2020 || 70 || align=left | — || 
|- id="2004 QJ35" bgcolor=#fefefe
| 0 ||  || MBA-I || 17.5 || data-sort-value="0.94" | 940 m || multiple || 2004–2021 || 03 Jan 2021 || 52 || align=left | — || 
|- id="2004 QK35" bgcolor=#E9E9E9
| 0 ||  || MBA-M || 18.0 || 1.1 km || multiple || 2004–2019 || 27 Jan 2019 || 45 || align=left | — || 
|- id="2004 QL35" bgcolor=#fefefe
| 0 ||  || MBA-I || 18.90 || data-sort-value="0.49" | 490 m || multiple || 2004–2021 || 08 Aug 2021 || 71 || align=left | — || 
|- id="2004 QN35" bgcolor=#fefefe
| 0 ||  || MBA-I || 18.3 || data-sort-value="0.65" | 650 m || multiple || 2004–2019 || 27 Nov 2019 || 39 || align=left | — || 
|- id="2004 QO35" bgcolor=#d6d6d6
| 1 ||  || MBA-O || 17.6 || 1.7 km || multiple || 2004–2020 || 24 Dec 2020 || 43 || align=left | — || 
|- id="2004 QQ35" bgcolor=#d6d6d6
| 0 ||  || MBA-O || 17.1 || 2.1 km || multiple || 2004–2021 || 05 Jan 2021 || 44 || align=left | — || 
|- id="2004 QR35" bgcolor=#E9E9E9
| 0 ||  || MBA-M || 17.33 || 1.4 km || multiple || 2004–2021 || 25 Sep 2021 || 90 || align=left | — || 
|- id="2004 QT35" bgcolor=#E9E9E9
| 0 ||  || MBA-M || 18.2 || data-sort-value="0.96" | 960 m || multiple || 2004–2017 || 13 Sep 2017 || 39 || align=left | — || 
|- id="2004 QW35" bgcolor=#fefefe
| 3 ||  || MBA-I || 19.1 || data-sort-value="0.45" | 450 m || multiple || 2004–2019 || 25 Sep 2019 || 35 || align=left | — || 
|- id="2004 QY35" bgcolor=#d6d6d6
| 0 ||  || MBA-O || 16.98 || 2.2 km || multiple || 2004–2021 || 28 Oct 2021 || 65 || align=left | — || 
|- id="2004 QZ35" bgcolor=#fefefe
| 0 ||  || MBA-I || 18.36 || data-sort-value="0.63" | 630 m || multiple || 2004–2021 || 18 May 2021 || 59 || align=left | — || 
|- id="2004 QA36" bgcolor=#d6d6d6
| 0 ||  || MBA-O || 17.2 || 2.0 km || multiple || 1994–2020 || 13 Nov 2020 || 82 || align=left | — || 
|- id="2004 QC36" bgcolor=#fefefe
| 1 ||  || HUN || 19.0 || data-sort-value="0.47" | 470 m || multiple || 2004–2020 || 23 Sep 2020 || 65 || align=left | — || 
|- id="2004 QD36" bgcolor=#fefefe
| 1 ||  || MBA-I || 18.7 || data-sort-value="0.54" | 540 m || multiple || 2004–2019 || 01 Oct 2019 || 24 || align=left | — || 
|- id="2004 QE36" bgcolor=#fefefe
| 1 ||  || MBA-I || 18.4 || data-sort-value="0.62" | 620 m || multiple || 1997–2019 || 28 Nov 2019 || 49 || align=left | — || 
|- id="2004 QF36" bgcolor=#d6d6d6
| 0 ||  || MBA-O || 16.5 || 2.8 km || multiple || 2004–2020 || 11 Oct 2020 || 67 || align=left | — || 
|- id="2004 QG36" bgcolor=#d6d6d6
| 0 ||  || MBA-O || 17.3 || 1.9 km || multiple || 2004–2020 || 18 Dec 2020 || 42 || align=left | — || 
|- id="2004 QH36" bgcolor=#fefefe
| 0 ||  || MBA-I || 19.1 || data-sort-value="0.45" | 450 m || multiple || 2004–2019 || 17 Dec 2019 || 43 || align=left | — || 
|- id="2004 QJ36" bgcolor=#d6d6d6
| 2 ||  || MBA-O || 17.7 || 1.6 km || multiple || 2004–2019 || 27 Oct 2019 || 37 || align=left | — || 
|- id="2004 QK36" bgcolor=#d6d6d6
| 2 ||  || MBA-O || 17.7 || 1.6 km || multiple || 2004–2019 || 24 Dec 2019 || 35 || align=left | — || 
|- id="2004 QL36" bgcolor=#E9E9E9
| 0 ||  || MBA-M || 17.8 || 1.5 km || multiple || 2004–2018 || 07 Sep 2018 || 33 || align=left | — || 
|- id="2004 QM36" bgcolor=#E9E9E9
| 0 ||  || MBA-M || 17.59 || 1.7 km || multiple || 2004–2021 || 09 Apr 2021 || 38 || align=left | — || 
|- id="2004 QO36" bgcolor=#d6d6d6
| 0 ||  || MBA-O || 16.5 || 2.8 km || multiple || 2004–2020 || 26 Jan 2020 || 55 || align=left | — || 
|- id="2004 QP36" bgcolor=#fefefe
| 0 ||  || MBA-I || 18.3 || data-sort-value="0.65" | 650 m || multiple || 2004–2019 || 02 Nov 2019 || 46 || align=left | — || 
|- id="2004 QQ36" bgcolor=#d6d6d6
| 2 ||  || MBA-O || 17.9 || 1.5 km || multiple || 2004–2019 || 25 Oct 2019 || 47 || align=left | — || 
|- id="2004 QR36" bgcolor=#fefefe
| 0 ||  || MBA-I || 18.3 || data-sort-value="0.65" | 650 m || multiple || 2004–2020 || 24 Jan 2020 || 51 || align=left | — || 
|- id="2004 QS36" bgcolor=#fefefe
| 0 ||  || MBA-I || 18.47 || data-sort-value="0.60" | 600 m || multiple || 2004–2021 || 10 Apr 2021 || 51 || align=left | — || 
|- id="2004 QT36" bgcolor=#d6d6d6
| 0 ||  || MBA-O || 17.05 || 2.2 km || multiple || 2004–2021 || 23 Nov 2021 || 72 || align=left | — || 
|- id="2004 QU36" bgcolor=#fefefe
| 1 ||  || MBA-I || 19.0 || data-sort-value="0.47" | 470 m || multiple || 2004–2019 || 02 Nov 2019 || 39 || align=left | — || 
|- id="2004 QV36" bgcolor=#d6d6d6
| 0 ||  || MBA-O || 17.17 || 2.0 km || multiple || 2004–2021 || 26 Oct 2021 || 64 || align=left | — || 
|- id="2004 QW36" bgcolor=#fefefe
| 0 ||  || MBA-I || 18.59 || data-sort-value="0.57" | 570 m || multiple || 2004–2021 || 08 May 2021 || 34 || align=left | — || 
|- id="2004 QX36" bgcolor=#E9E9E9
| 2 ||  || MBA-M || 18.1 || 1.3 km || multiple || 2004–2018 || 10 Oct 2018 || 32 || align=left | — || 
|- id="2004 QY36" bgcolor=#fefefe
| 0 ||  || MBA-I || 18.3 || data-sort-value="0.65" | 650 m || multiple || 2004–2021 || 08 Jun 2021 || 87 || align=left | Disc.: SpacewatchAdded on 22 July 2020 || 
|- id="2004 QZ36" bgcolor=#fefefe
| 0 ||  || MBA-I || 18.94 || data-sort-value="0.48" | 480 m || multiple || 2004–2021 || 29 Nov 2021 || 41 || align=left | Disc.: SpacewatchAdded on 22 July 2020 || 
|- id="2004 QB37" bgcolor=#fefefe
| 0 ||  || MBA-I || 18.4 || data-sort-value="0.62" | 620 m || multiple || 2004–2018 || 13 Jul 2018 || 46 || align=left | Disc.: SpacewatchAdded on 19 October 2020 || 
|- id="2004 QC37" bgcolor=#E9E9E9
| 2 ||  || MBA-M || 18.95 || data-sort-value="0.90" | 900 m || multiple || 2004–2018 || 07 Nov 2018 || 26 || align=left | Disc.: SpacewatchAdded on 19 October 2020 || 
|- id="2004 QD37" bgcolor=#d6d6d6
| 0 ||  || MBA-O || 17.4 || 1.8 km || multiple || 1999–2020 || 26 Sep 2020 || 39 || align=left | Disc.: SpacewatchAdded on 17 January 2021 || 
|- id="2004 QE37" bgcolor=#fefefe
| 2 ||  || MBA-I || 19.7 || data-sort-value="0.34" | 340 m || multiple || 2004–2020 || 05 Nov 2020 || 53 || align=left | Disc.: SpacewatchAdded on 17 January 2021 || 
|- id="2004 QF37" bgcolor=#d6d6d6
| 0 ||  || MBA-O || 17.0 || 2.2 km || multiple || 2004–2020 || 23 Sep 2020 || 44 || align=left | Disc.: SpacewatchAdded on 17 January 2021 || 
|- id="2004 QG37" bgcolor=#E9E9E9
| 2 ||  || MBA-M || 18.0 || data-sort-value="0.75" | 750 m || multiple || 2004–2020 || 23 Sep 2020 || 55 || align=left | Disc.: SpacewatchAdded on 17 January 2021 || 
|- id="2004 QH37" bgcolor=#fefefe
| 0 ||  || MBA-I || 18.7 || data-sort-value="0.54" | 540 m || multiple || 2004–2020 || 23 Jul 2020 || 51 || align=left | Disc.: SpacewatchAdded on 17 January 2021 || 
|- id="2004 QJ37" bgcolor=#fefefe
| 0 ||  || MBA-I || 19.14 || data-sort-value="0.44" | 440 m || multiple || 2004–2021 || 07 Nov 2021 || 72 || align=left | Disc.: SpacewatchAdded on 17 January 2021 || 
|- id="2004 QK37" bgcolor=#d6d6d6
| 0 ||  || MBA-O || 17.5 || 1.8 km || multiple || 2004–2020 || 26 Sep 2020 || 61 || align=left | Disc.: SpacewatchAdded on 17 January 2021 || 
|- id="2004 QL37" bgcolor=#fefefe
| 2 ||  || MBA-I || 18.7 || data-sort-value="0.54" | 540 m || multiple || 2004–2019 || 22 Oct 2019 || 28 || align=left | Disc.: SpacewatchAdded on 17 January 2021 || 
|- id="2004 QM37" bgcolor=#d6d6d6
| 0 ||  || MBA-O || 16.75 || 2.5 km || multiple || 2004–2021 || 27 Nov 2021 || 89 || align=left | Disc.: SpacewatchAdded on 17 January 2021 || 
|- id="2004 QN37" bgcolor=#E9E9E9
| 0 ||  || MBA-M || 17.97 || data-sort-value="0.76" | 760 m || multiple || 2004–2021 || 28 Nov 2021 || 59 || align=left | Disc.: SpacewatchAdded on 17 January 2021 || 
|- id="2004 QO37" bgcolor=#E9E9E9
| 0 ||  || MBA-M || 18.54 || data-sort-value="0.58" | 580 m || multiple || 2004–2021 || 09 Nov 2021 || 47 || align=left | Disc.: SpacewatchAdded on 9 March 2021 || 
|- id="2004 QP37" bgcolor=#d6d6d6
| 1 ||  || MBA-O || 17.4 || 1.8 km || multiple || 2004–2020 || 07 Dec 2020 || 27 || align=left | Disc.: SpacewatchAdded on 9 March 2021 || 
|- id="2004 QQ37" bgcolor=#E9E9E9
| 2 ||  || MBA-M || 18.4 || 1.2 km || multiple || 2004–2018 || 06 Oct 2018 || 28 || align=left | Disc.: SpacewatchAdded on 9 March 2021 || 
|- id="2004 QS37" bgcolor=#d6d6d6
| 0 ||  || MBA-O || 17.3 || 1.9 km || multiple || 2004–2020 || 17 Oct 2020 || 36 || align=left | Disc.: SpacewatchAdded on 11 May 2021 || 
|- id="2004 QT37" bgcolor=#E9E9E9
| 0 ||  || MBA-M || 17.7 || 1.6 km || multiple || 2003–2021 || 29 Apr 2021 || 35 || align=left | Disc.: SpacewatchAdded on 17 June 2021 || 
|- id="2004 QU37" bgcolor=#E9E9E9
| 0 ||  || MBA-M || 18.02 || 1.0 km || multiple || 2004–2021 || 12 Aug 2021 || 42 || align=left | Disc.: SpacewatchAdded on 17 June 2021 || 
|- id="2004 QV37" bgcolor=#E9E9E9
| 0 ||  || MBA-M || 17.5 || 1.8 km || multiple || 2000–2021 || 07 Jun 2021 || 44 || align=left | Disc.: SpacewatchAdded on 17 June 2021 || 
|- id="2004 QW37" bgcolor=#E9E9E9
| 0 ||  || MBA-M || 18.21 || data-sort-value="0.96" | 960 m || multiple || 2004–2021 || 12 May 2021 || 40 || align=left | Disc.: SpacewatchAdded on 17 June 2021 || 
|- id="2004 QX37" bgcolor=#E9E9E9
| 2 ||  || MBA-M || 17.9 || 1.1 km || multiple || 2004–2019 || 10 Jan 2019 || 28 || align=left | Disc.: SpacewatchAdded on 17 June 2021 || 
|- id="2004 QY37" bgcolor=#fefefe
| 0 ||  || MBA-I || 19.4 || data-sort-value="0.39" | 390 m || multiple || 2004–2020 || 23 May 2020 || 23 || align=left | Disc.: SpacewatchAdded on 17 June 2021 || 
|- id="2004 QZ37" bgcolor=#d6d6d6
| 0 ||  || MBA-O || 16.3 || 3.1 km || multiple || 2004–2020 || 01 Jan 2020 || 38 || align=left | Disc.: SpacewatchAdded on 21 August 2021 || 
|- id="2004 QA38" bgcolor=#fefefe
| 2 ||  || MBA-I || 19.5 || data-sort-value="0.37" | 370 m || multiple || 1997–2018 || 08 Nov 2018 || 27 || align=left | Disc.: SpacewatchAdded on 21 August 2021 || 
|- id="2004 QB38" bgcolor=#fefefe
| 0 ||  || MBA-I || 19.16 || data-sort-value="0.44" | 440 m || multiple || 2004–2021 || 28 Nov 2021 || 28 || align=left | Disc.: SpacewatchAdded on 21 August 2021 || 
|- id="2004 QC38" bgcolor=#FA8072
| 0 ||  || MCA || 20.09 || data-sort-value="0.29" | 290 m || multiple || 2004–2021 || 03 Oct 2021 || 34 || align=left | Disc.: SpacewatchAdded on 21 August 2021 || 
|- id="2004 QD38" bgcolor=#d6d6d6
| 0 ||  || MBA-O || 16.97 || 2.2 km || multiple || 2004–2021 || 04 Oct 2021 || 50 || align=left | Disc.: SpacewatchAdded on 21 August 2021 || 
|- id="2004 QE38" bgcolor=#d6d6d6
| 0 ||  || MBA-O || 17.06 || 2.2 km || multiple || 2004–2021 || 08 Sep 2021 || 83 || align=left | Disc.: MLSAdded on 21 August 2021Alt.: 2010 MM136, 2020 HQ41 || 
|- id="2004 QF38" bgcolor=#E9E9E9
| 0 ||  || MBA-M || 18.3 || data-sort-value="0.92" | 920 m || multiple || 2004–2021 || 31 Aug 2021 || 32 || align=left | Disc.: SpacewatchAdded on 30 September 2021 || 
|- id="2004 QG38" bgcolor=#d6d6d6
| 0 ||  || MBA-O || 17.23 || 2.0 km || multiple || 2004–2021 || 27 Oct 2021 || 38 || align=left | Disc.: SpacewatchAdded on 30 September 2021 || 
|- id="2004 QH38" bgcolor=#d6d6d6
| 0 ||  || MBA-O || 16.8 || 2.4 km || multiple || 2004–2021 || 02 Oct 2021 || 72 || align=left | Disc.: WISEAdded on 30 September 2021Alt.: 2010 MU82 || 
|- id="2004 QJ38" bgcolor=#fefefe
| 0 ||  || MBA-I || 19.43 || data-sort-value="0.39" | 390 m || multiple || 2004–2021 || 07 Nov 2021 || 66 || align=left | Disc.: SpacewatchAdded on 30 September 2021 || 
|- id="2004 QK38" bgcolor=#d6d6d6
| 2 ||  || MBA-O || 17.84 || 1.5 km || multiple || 2004–2021 || 04 Oct 2021 || 24 || align=left | Disc.: SpacewatchAdded on 30 September 2021 || 
|- id="2004 QL38" bgcolor=#E9E9E9
| 0 ||  || MBA-M || 17.84 || data-sort-value="0.80" | 800 m || multiple || 2004–2021 || 28 Nov 2021 || 70 || align=left | Disc.: SpacewatchAdded on 30 September 2021 || 
|- id="2004 QM38" bgcolor=#fefefe
| 3 ||  || MBA-I || 19.4 || data-sort-value="0.39" | 390 m || multiple || 2004–2020 || 11 Nov 2020 || 17 || align=left | Disc.: SpacewatchAdded on 5 November 2021 || 
|- id="2004 QN38" bgcolor=#E9E9E9
| 0 ||  || MBA-M || 18.1 || 1.0 km || multiple || 2004–2021 || 06 Oct 2021 || 44 || align=left | Disc.: SpacewatchAdded on 5 November 2021 || 
|- id="2004 QO38" bgcolor=#E9E9E9
| 1 ||  || MBA-M || 18.21 || data-sort-value="0.68" | 680 m || multiple || 2004–2022 || 04 Jan 2022 || 96 || align=left | Disc.: SpacewatchAdded on 5 November 2021Alt.: 2004 RB28 || 
|- id="2004 QP38" bgcolor=#fefefe
| 0 ||  || MBA-I || 18.93 || data-sort-value="0.49" | 490 m || multiple || 2004–2021 || 15 Apr 2021 || 36 || align=left | Disc.: SpacewatchAdded on 5 November 2021 || 
|- id="2004 QQ38" bgcolor=#E9E9E9
| 0 ||  || MBA-M || 18.42 || data-sort-value="0.62" | 620 m || multiple || 2000–2022 || 06 Jan 2022 || 29 || align=left | Disc.: SpacewatchAdded on 5 November 2021 || 
|- id="2004 QR38" bgcolor=#d6d6d6
| 1 ||  || MBA-O || 16.45 || 2.9 km || multiple || 2004–2022 || 07 Jan 2022 || 22 || align=left | Disc.: SpacewatchAdded on 5 November 2021 || 
|- id="2004 QS38" bgcolor=#E9E9E9
| 1 ||  || MBA-M || 17.63 || data-sort-value="0.89" | 890 m || multiple || 2004–2021 || 28 Nov 2021 || 43 || align=left | Disc.: SpacewatchAdded on 5 November 2021 || 
|- id="2004 QT38" bgcolor=#E9E9E9
| 0 ||  || MBA-M || 18.60 || data-sort-value="0.80" | 800 m || multiple || 2004–2021 || 08 Nov 2021 || 48 || align=left | Disc.: SpacewatchAdded on 5 November 2021 || 
|- id="2004 QU38" bgcolor=#d6d6d6
| 0 ||  || MBA-O || 17.83 || 1.5 km || multiple || 2004–2021 || 28 Nov 2021 || 52 || align=left | Disc.: SpacewatchAdded on 24 December 2021 || 
|- id="2004 QV38" bgcolor=#E9E9E9
| 1 ||  || MBA-M || 18.50 || data-sort-value="0.59" | 590 m || multiple || 2004–2021 || 30 Nov 2021 || 28 || align=left | Disc.: SpacewatchAdded on 24 December 2021 || 
|- id="2004 QW38" bgcolor=#E9E9E9
| 0 ||  || MBA-M || 17.7 || 1.6 km || multiple || 2004–2019 || 04 Jan 2019 || 42 || align=left | Disc.: SpacewatchAdded on 24 December 2021 || 
|- id="2004 QX38" bgcolor=#d6d6d6
| 0 ||  || MBA-O || 17.2 || 2.0 km || multiple || 2002–2021 || 30 Oct 2021 || 32 || align=left | Disc.: SpacewatchAdded on 24 December 2021 || 
|}
back to top

References 
 

Lists of unnumbered minor planets